= Independent union =

Type of trade union

An independent union is a trade union that is independent of something.

Historically it referred to a trade union which represents workers that is free of employer control. (This includes a union representing workers in more than one plant located in two or more states but employed by the same employer).

== United Kingdom ==
=== Indie union ===
In the United Kingdom, indie union is a term used to describe younger grassroots trade unions which organise workers seen as unorganisable by mainstream trade unions, particularly migrant workers and those working in precarious employment. The three main indie unions are:

- The Independent Workers' Union of Great Britain
- The United Voices of the World
- The Cleaners and Allied Independent Workers Union.

== North America ==
In North America, a national independent union is a union of a national character not affiliated with the AFL - CIO; a local independent union is one of a local character not affiliated with the international union having jurisdiction over that branch of industry.

== See also ==
- List of labor unions in the United States § Independent
- National Federation of Independent Unions
- United Electrical, Radio and Machine Workers of America
- Industrial Workers of the World
