= List of Industrial Workers of the World unions =

Partial list of notable past and current union shops, branches, or international unions belonging to the Industrial Workers of the World.

== Industrial Unions ==
- Agricultural Workers Organization, later Agricultural Workers Industrial Union
- Australasian Meat Industry Employees Union (disaffiliated in the 1920s)
- Bakery Workers' Industrial Union (existed in 1919)
- Construction Workers' Industrial Union (existed in 1919)
- Coal Miners' Industrial Union (existed in 1919)
- Fishermen's Industrial Union (existed in 1919)
- Foodstuff Workers' Industrial Union (existed in 1919)
- Furniture Workers' Industrial Union (existed in 1919)
- General Distribution Workers' Industrial Union (existed in 1919)
- Hotel, Restaurant and Domestic Workers' Industrial Union (existed in 1919)
- Lumber Workers Industrial Union
  - The Brotherhood of Timber Workers
- Marine Transport Workers Industrial Union
- Metal and Machinery Workers Industrial Union (dissolved in the 1950s)
- Metal Mine Workers' Industrial Union
- Motor Transport Workers Industrial Union
- Oil Workers' Industrial Union (existed in 1919)
- Printing and Publishing Workers' Industrial Union (existed in 1919)
- Railroad Workers' Industrial Union (existed in 1919)
- Rubber Workers' Industrial Union (existed in 1919)
- Shipbuilding Workers' Industrial Union (existed in 1919)
- Textile Workers' Industrial Union (formerly National Industrial Union of Textile Workers, United States)
- Western Federation of Miners (only briefly affiliated)

== Shops ==
- Just Coffee Cooperative
- Jimmy John's Workers Union
- Ottawa Panhandlers' Union
- Peoples' Wherehouse
- Red and Black Cafe (2009–2014)
- Red Emma's Bookstore Coffeehouse
- Starbucks Workers Union
- Street Labourers of Windsor
- United Campaign Workers

== See also ==
- Industrial Workers of the World organizational evolution
