= Burgerville =

American fast casual hamburger restaurant

Burgerville, LLC
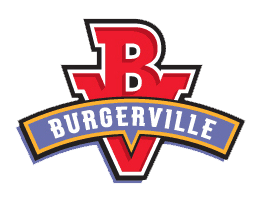

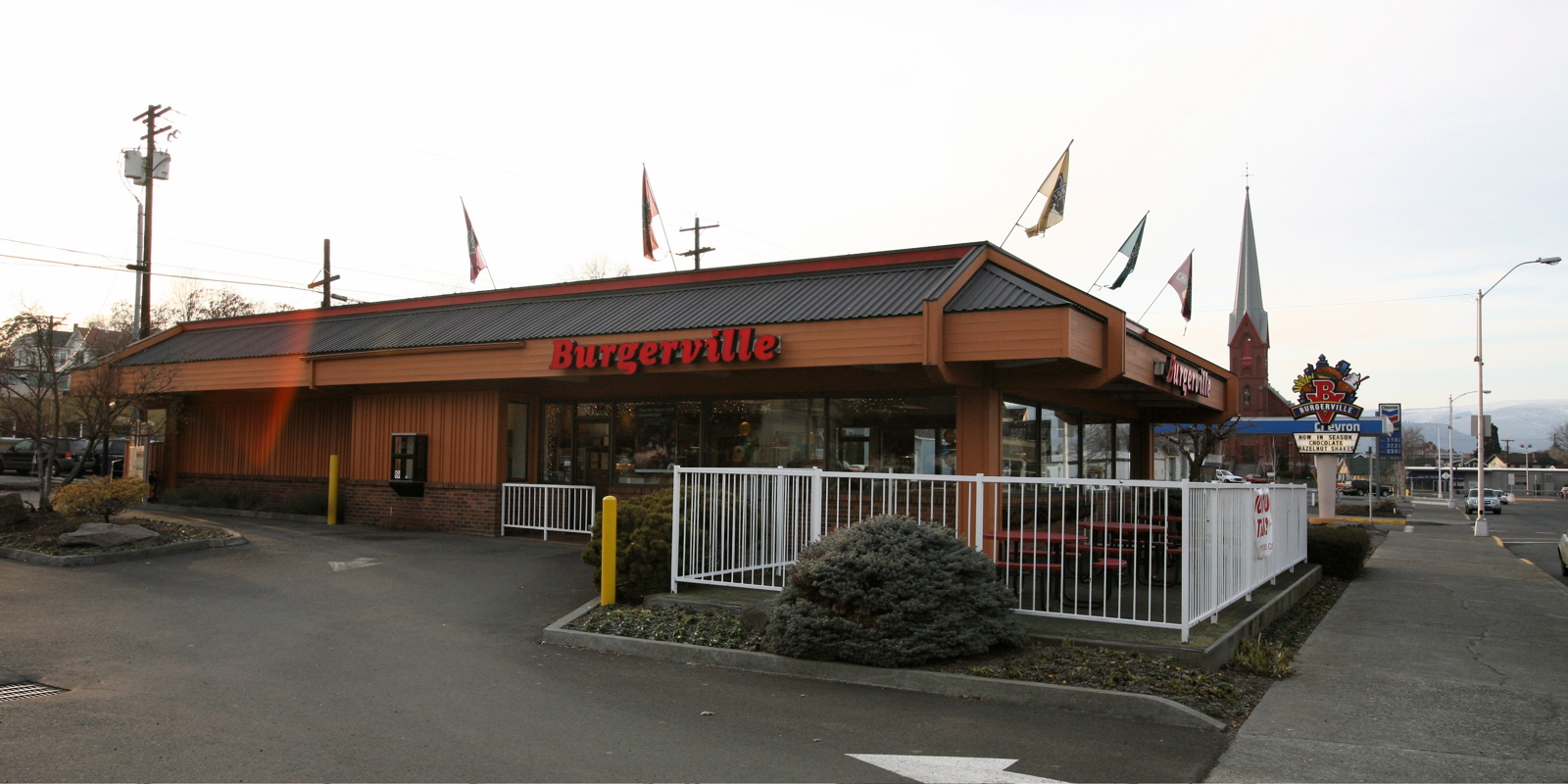
- Burgerville in The Dalles
- Trade name: Burgerville
- Type: Private
- Industry: Fast Casual
- Founded: 1961; 65 years ago
- Founder: George Propstra
- Headquarters: Vancouver, Washington
- Number of locations: 47 (2016)
- Products: Fast food, including hamburgers, french fries
- Revenue: Approx. $75 million (2010)
- Number of employees: 1,300 (2013)
- Parent: The Holland Inc.
- Website: www.burgerville.com

Burgerville (originally Burgerville USA) is a privately held American restaurant chain in Oregon and southwest Washington, owned by The Holland Inc. As the chain's name suggests, Burgerville's sandwich menu consists mostly of hamburgers. As of May 2005, all Burgerville locations were within a 180-mile (290-km) radius, mostly in the Portland metropolitan area. The chain had annual revenue of around $75 million in 2010, at which time it had 39 locations and about 1,500 employees.

In addition to burgers and fries, Burgerville offers other products such as chicken and turkey sandwiches, veggie burgers, fish sandwiches, and fish and chips. The chain uses local ingredients, such as Tillamook Cheddar, and locally grown strawberries in its milkshakes and sundaes. Throughout the year it offers seasonal items such as milkshakes made with hazelnuts, pumpkin, fresh raspberries, fresh strawberries, and blackberries, and side orders such as Walla Walla onion rings, sweet potato fries, tempura-style fried asparagus and Yukon Gold potatoes.

== History ==
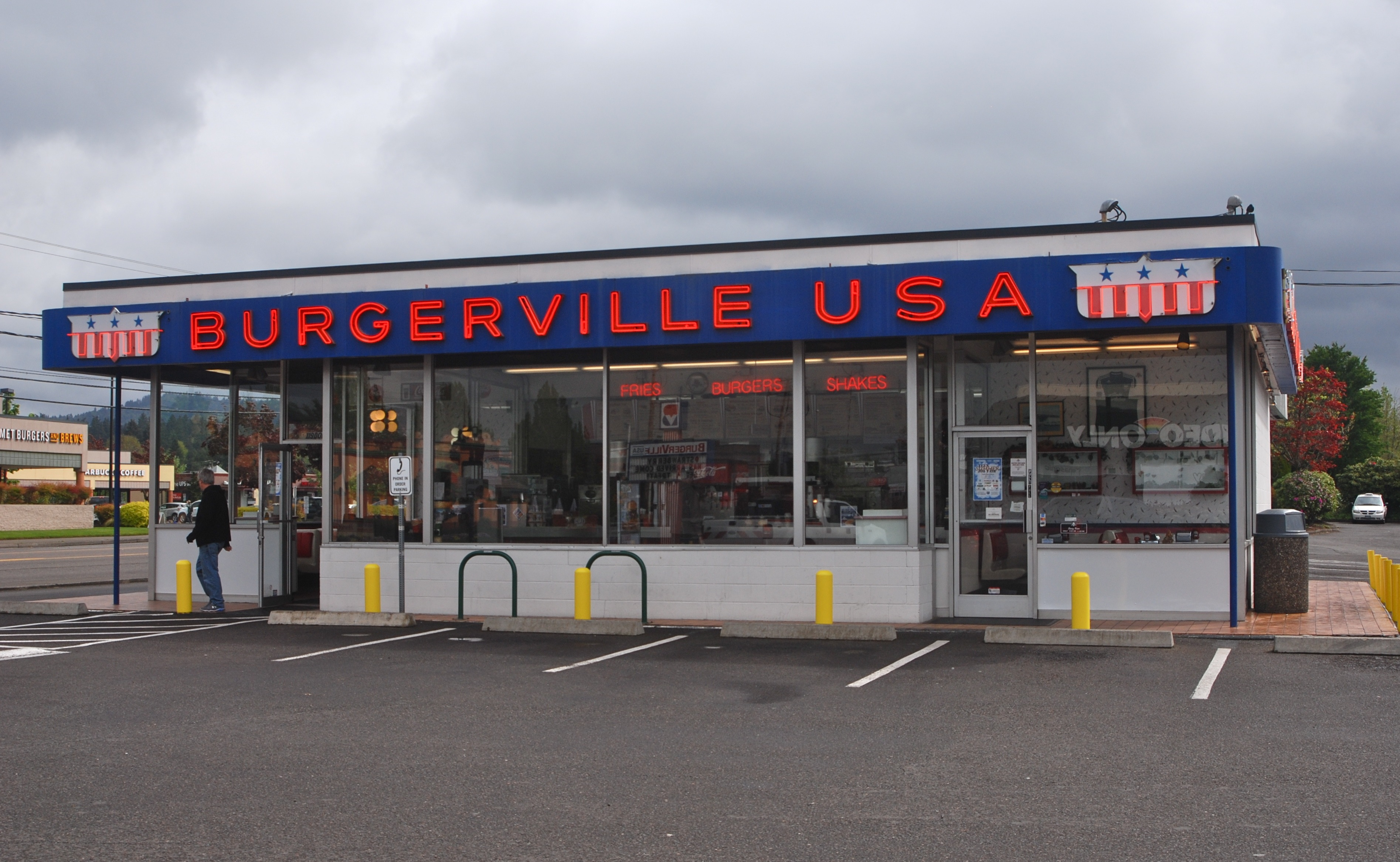
The 1969-opened Burgerville in central Beaverton, Oregon, retained its original appearance until its closure 50 years later, in 2019.

Burgerville was founded in 1961 by George Propstra in Vancouver, Washington. The first Burgerville was located on Mill Plain Blvd in Vancouver, about three miles east of downtown on the southeast corner of Mill Plain and Morrison.

The chain uses 100% wind power for all of its restaurants and headquarters, and is the largest chain in America to do so. Burgerville uses only trans fat-free canola oil and sends 7,500 gallons per month to be transformed into biodiesel. In 2004, Burgerville switched to range-fed beef raised without hormones and antibiotics. In 2007, it began composting food waste which is expected to result in an 85% reduction in waste and $100,000 annual savings.

In September 2009, after complaints from bicycle commuters, Burgerville began allowing bicyclists to order using its drive-through windows .

The fast casual restaurant chain was named by Gourmet magazine as having the freshest fast food in the country in 2003, with offerings such as a salad with smoked salmon and Oregon hazelnuts. As of August 2007, their slogan is, "Choose Fresh, Local, Sustainable. Choose Burgerville." Also in 2007, Burgerville was awarded with the "Better Burger" award at the 1st Annual Food Network Awards.

In January 2008, Jeff Harvey accepted the position of President and CEO of Burgerville after Tom Mears, the former holder of the titles stepped aside, and became Chairman of the company.

In October 2018, Burgerville disclosed that it had suffered a data breach by the Fin7 hacking group of all customer credit and debit card information processed from September 2017 to September 2018.

=== Burgerville Workers Union ===
In April 2016, Burgerville workers organized and formed a labor union, the Burgerville Workers Union, with support from Portland IWW, among other groups. The company opposed the union organizing effort and sought to discourage workers from joining. In 2018, the workers of one Burgerville restaurant in southeast Portland voted 18-4 in an NLRB-administered election to form a labor union; the vote compels the company to officially recognize the Burgerville Workers Union (BVWU) and to collectively bargain with it. The BVWU is the only fast food union in the United States with federal recognition.

The union has demanded a $5 an hour increase in wages for all workers, fair scheduling, improved health care, and parental leave. In October 2019, the workers union was preparing to strike following a breakdown of negotiations with the company over the previous 18 months. The company had offered an increase of $1 per hour for all employees to $13.50, six months ahead of when Portland's local minimum was set to increase to $13.25.

As of October 2019, five Burgerville locations have held successful union drives.

== Locations ==
As of October 2016, Burgerville had 47 locations throughout Oregon and Washington.

On major highways leaving Burgerville's reach, there is usually a billboard resembling an overhead highway warning sign alerting drivers that there will not be another Burgerville location for approximately another 24,700 miles (39,750 km), which is the distance to the next Burgerville should one continue around the globe in that direction. The distance reported on each sign varies depending on the actual location of the billboard.

== See also ==
- List of hamburger restaurants
