= Matthew Smith (labor activist) =

- Born: Matthew Smith; 1893; Oldham, England
- Died: February 25, 1958 (aged 63–64); Miami Beach, Florida, USA
- Occupation: National Secretary of the Mechanics Educational Society of America (1933–1958)
- Spouse: Dora Smith

Matthew Smith (1893 - February 25, 1958) was a labor activist in England and the United States. In 1933, he helped found the Mechanics Educational Society of America (MESA), which he served as national secretary of the group from 1933 until his death in 1958. Though he resided in the United States from 1926 until his death, he refused to apply for the U.S. citizenship and instead saw himself as "...an internationalist, a citizen of the human race."

As a socialist and pacifist, he opposed involvement in both World War I and World War II.

== England ==
Smith was born in Oldham and worked in the English textile district of Lancashire. A skilled metalworker, he was part of the Shop Stewards Movement which opposed the production of munitions for the First World War. Opposed to the war, he went to jail for opposing the draft despite the exemption of men with his skill set having to fight. After participating in the failed 1926 general strike, Smith and his wife Dora emigrated to Canada in the same year. In 1928, they moved again to the United States, settling in Detroit.

== United States ==
In the United States, Smith resumed his radical pro-labor activities and eventually met socialist lawyer Maurice Sugar. Smith helped form the Mechanics Educational Society of America in February 1933 and Sugar served as its lead counsel during its initial strike in Flint, Michigan in September 1933. Founded among skilled tool and die workers in Detroit's automobile industry, MESA was known for class-conscious militant unionism which opposed the craft union-dominated American Federation of Labor.

In July 1938, the Smith-led MESA rejected an invitation to merge with the recently organized Congress of Industrial Organizations, citing "fundamental differences in policy" while also arguing the CIO's established union in the auto-industry, United Autoworkers (UAW), was run by a "quasi-dictatorship." In 1942, he helped organize and was named chairman of the Confederated Unions of America, which sought to form a third labor federation which was opposed to both the American Federation of Labor and the Congress of Industrial Organizations. At the time of its founding, its membership included 35 unions or associations and 260,000 members.

Smith died in February 1958 in Miami Beach, Florida of a heart attack. His wife, Dora, had died three weeks prior.
