= Mechanics Educational Society of America =

American trade union

- Merged into: United Auto Workers
- Founded: 1933
- Location: Detroit, Michigan
- Key people: Matthew Smith, Bert Cochran
- Affiliations: Confederated Unions of America

The Mechanics Educational Society of America (MESA) was an independent trade union of tool-and-die-makers. First active in the automobile industry of greater Detroit, Michigan, MESA was founded in 1933 and was "the first union to effectively establish itself in what had been a traditionally open shop strong, Detroit's mass production automobile industry." MESA's general secretary was English immigrant Matthew Smith.

== Origins ==
The Mechanics Educational Society of America was founded by disgruntled members of the International Association of Machinists as an educational society. However, radical transplants from the United Kingdom like Smith, Frank McCracken, and John Anderson recognized the potential of the group and pushed for a full-fledged union. In June 1933, the U.S. Congress passed the National Industrial Recovery Act of 1933 which protected the collective bargaining rights of unions. A month later, MESA began an organizing drive in Detroit, Pontiac, Michigan, and Flint, Michigan which increased membership to approximately 5,000.

== Leading members ==
Longtime national secretary Matthew Smith, who had been active in the Amalgamated Engineering Union in England, refused to obtain U.S. citizenship, telling a U.S. Congress subcommittee: "I'm an internationalist, a citizen of the human race." Another prominent leader was Trotskyist Bert Cochran, who was a district organizer for MESA during the 1930s and 1940s. However, Cochran led several MESA locals out of MESA and into the UAW.

== Membership and Locals ==
Membership in 1944 was approximately 42,000. By 1935, the union had expanded out of Detroit into other cities with a significant amount of industrial workers, including Rome, New York, Flint, Michigan, Toledo, Ohio, Cleveland, Ohio, Defiance, Ohio and the Connecticut cities of Torrington, New Haven, and Bridgeport.

== Federation and World War II ==
In July 1938, MESA rejected an invitation to merge with the recently organized Congress of Industrial Organizations, citing "fundamental differences in policy" while also arguing the CIO's established union in the auto-industry, United Autoworkers (UAW), was run by a "quasi-dictatorship." In 1942, MESA became a founding member of the Confederated Unions of America. A 1944 article in the American Economic Review described the group as "...a class-conscious group far to the left of the AFL internationals and even most of the CIO affiliates."

MESA refused to adopt a no-strike pledge that other unions had agreed to during World War II. As such, it was targeted by the federal government via the National Labor Relations Board; in jurisdictional disputes with the CIO, the government consistently decided against MESA. In response, MESA's membership went on strike. In November 1944, United States Under Secretary of War Robert P. Patterson wrote to MESA's Smith saying "Your strikes...represent no honest grievance...You are striking our fighting men from the rear. The War Department insists these strike be stopped at once." MESA refused to end the strike.

== Taft-Hartley and CIO Affiliation ==
In 1947, the Taft–Hartley Act became law. One of its provisions required union leaders to file affidavits with the United States Department of Labor declaring that they were not supporters of the Communist Party and had no relationship with any organization seeking the "overthrow of the United States government by force or by any illegal or unconstitutional means", to which MESA acquiesced. The prevailing Red Scare, which began in 1947 and coincided with a period of McCarthyism, put a damper on popular support for radical unions like the Mechanics. In 1954, MESA absorbed the Metal and Machinery Workers Industrial Union (MMWIU), which had previously been affiliated with the Industrial Workers of the World. In December of that year, MESA and its 12,000 members affiliated with the former jurisdictional opponent in the CIO. A year later, in December 1955, the CIO, with the Mechanics as an affiliate, merged with the AFL to form the AFL–CIO.
