= Socialist Union of America =

Trotskyist organization in the 1950s

- Abbreviation: SUA
- Founders: Bert Cochran
- Founded: 1953
- Dissolved: 1959
- Split from: Socialist Workers Party
- Newspaper: American Socialist
- Ideology: Communism; Trotskyism
- Political position: Far-left

The Socialist Union of America, also called American Socialist Union, Socialist Union or Cochranites were a Trotskyist group that split from the Socialist Workers Party in 1953 and disbanded in 1959. It included most of the SWPs trade union base, as well as others sympathetic to the "Pabloist" line of the International Secretariat of the Fourth International, though it was never recognized as a section of the ISFI.

== History ==
A dissident tendency had begun to crystallize within the SWPs Michigan/Ohio District around 1948-1949 led by Bert Cochran. It included the SWP fractions within the UAW locals in Flint and Detroit, Michigan, as well as Toledo and Cleveland, Ohio; the fractions in the United Rubber Workers in Akron, led by Jules Geller; and a group around Harry Braverman within the United Steelworkers in Youngstown. This tendency was beginning to have grave doubts about the sectarian nature of the SWP, and felt that the concepts of democratic centralism and the vanguard party were out of place in the context of the United States in the 1950s. They did not believe that capitalism was heading for a revolutionary crisis, and felt that a socialist educational group for propaganda among the workers was more appropriate at that point than a vanguard party. They also believed in making alliances with the Communists within the CIO unions to fight against expulsions, and that Communists and fellow travelers should be the primary area of recruitment, especially as many were becoming disillusioned with Stalinism.

A related, but distinct tendency was led by George Clarke, the SWP representative on the International Secretariat and Milton Zaslow, the Organizer of the SWPs New York local. This group was more directly influenced by the ideas of Michel Pablo, the secretary of the Fourth International at the time. They believed that because of the pressures of the Cold War the masses had forced the Soviet Union and the other Degenerated workers' states to become more revolutionary. In concert with Pablo-aligned Trotskyists in other countries, this group felt that it would be best under the circumstances to focus on recruiting among Communists and fellow travelers, in lieu of formal entrism.

The formal split began in early 1953 when Zaslow presented a document, "Report and Tasks", to the New York Local outlining his ideas. This set off a spirited debate within the party, even though a "truce" was attempted by the leaderships May Plenum. In August of that year the Zaslow group lost control of the New York Local in a city convention. A final split was "provoked" in late October when the oppositionists boycotted the 25th anniversary celebration of the expulsion of James Cannon, Max Shachtman and Martin Abern from the Communist Party, which they regarded as the foundation of their movement. When they refused to disavow the boycott they were expelled. The split cost the SWP 25% of its membership, most of its base within organized labor and its entire organization in the state of Michigan.

The expelled members formed the American Socialist Union and began publishing a newspaper, the American Socialist. For the first three months of its existence, negotiations for unity were attempted between the Fourth International, the SWP and the ASU. When, three or months later this proved to be impossible Pablo asked the ASU to become the new US affiliate of the International Secretariat the Cochranites declined, believing that that would just lead the Socialist Union to become a kind of sect that feared the SWP had become.

The Cochranites focused much of their activity on publishing their newspaper, American Socialist. They kept their publication "ecumenical" open to people of various leftist philosophies, including Michael Harrington and W. E. B. Du Bois. Their major constituency was among the former SWP members within the CIO and ex-CIO unions, though they also attempted to recruit among the dissidents who left the Communist Party after its crisis of 1956-1957. Zaslow, Clarke and Irving Beinin left in 1957 to work within the remnants of the American Labor Party and in the group around The Guardian magazine, where Beinin became editor. By the late 1950s, Braverman and Geller were becoming increasingly attracted to Monthly Review and disenchanted with Cochran's style of journalism. The Socialist Union disbanded and the American Socialist ceased publication in December 1959.

== Publications ==
- Prospects of American radicalism by Bert Cochran New York, N.Y. : American Socialist Publications, 1954
