= United Campaign Workers =

United Campaign Workers is a union for canvassers, including street fundraisers, and paid petitioners for ballot initiatives. It is an organizing project of the Industrial Workers of the World, that publicly spread to three political campaigns in the summer of 2014 in Portland, Oregon.

The project began when canvassers walked off the job at the Campaign for the Restoration and Regulation of Hemp, citing mismanagement and late paychecks. The campaign spread a few weeks later to Grassroots Campaigns, Inc., a fundraiser for NGOs and political action committees, with workers alleging violation of the Portland sick day ordinance, as well as extremely high turnover due to their $130 a day fundraising quota. The campaign then spread to Fieldworks, LLC, a field organizing contractor. Union supporters discovered that the voter registration drive Fieldworks was employing them in was funded by AFSCME and several other trade unions. The union has attracted controversy for militant demands submitted to management, including a demand for free medical marijuana from the chief petitioners of the Campaign for the Restoration and Regulation of Hemp.
