= Frank Cedervall =

Frans Reinhold Cedervall (1904-1996) was a Swedish-American plasterer and labor organizer most well known for his time as a leading figure in the Industrial Workers of the World in Cleveland, Ohio. He was the lead organizer of the Metal and Machinery Workers Industrial Union and leader of its Cleveland Local 440.

Cedervall joined the Industrial Workers of the World in 1931 and was a soapbox speaker for the organization. After years of arrests and physical attacks, Cedervall stopped organizing on behalf of the organization, though he maintained membership until his death. Future Teamsters leader Jimmy Hoffa learned about public speaking from Cedervall, saying "I was with the IWW, and I followed Frank Cedervall around and learned how to make speeches from him. You spoke on a table top in a park, and you had to holler loud enough to be heard."

Cedervall died in 1996 at LakeWest Hospital in Willoughby, Ohio.
