= Bert Cochran =

Bert Cochran, born Alexander Goldfarb (December 25, 1913 – June 6, 1984) was an American Communist politician and writer. A Trotskyist, he was a member of the Socialist Workers Party from the 1930s to the 1950s.

== Biography ==
Cochran was born in Poland in 1913 and moved to the US at an early age. In the 1930s, Cochran attended the University of Wisconsin–Madison where he was recruited to the Trotskyist movement by Max Shachtman. In 1938 when a group of American Trotskyists under the leadership of James P. Cannon formed the Socialist Workers Party, Bert Cochran was one of them. For a number of years, Cochran was part of the National Committee, the leading body of the SWP and became the party's main leader in Detroit. Under the pen-name E.R. Frank he was a regular contributor to the magazine of the Fourth International, which the SWP supported.

In the 1930s and 1940s, Cochran was a district organizer for the Mechanics Educational Society of America (MESA), a radical independent union which drew the ire of the federal government for refusing to not strike during World War II. Cochran also organized with the United Autoworkers (UAW).

In the beginning of the 1950s, Bert Cochran became the leader of a faction inside the Socialist Workers Party that opposed the leadership of Cannon and instead favoured the approach of Michel Pablo, a leader of the Fourth International. The faction, known to their opponents as the Cochranites, argued that the SWP was abstaining in a sectarian manner from the opportunity to intervene into the radical layers around the Communist Party. The SWP's leadership interpreted this as meaning that the current around Cochran no longer believed a revolution in the United States was possible, and that they had recoiled from revolutionary activity under the dual pressures of relative post-World War II capitalist prosperity and the accompanying McCarthy-era anti-communist witch-hunt. Cochran was also criticised for proposing to remove the image of Trotsky from the masthead of the SWP's newspaper, The Militant.

Eventually, Bert Cochran and the Cochranites were expelled from the SWP in 1954, which meant that the party lost a great deal of its members in Detroit and the Cleveland area. James P. Cannon sent Ed Shaw to lead the reconstruction of the party's branch in Detroit.

Bert Cochran, with Harry Braverman and about one hundred of his supporters founded the Socialist Union of America, which existed from 1954 to approx. 1959. After a short period out of regular political activity, he became a sponsor of the Third Camp journal, New Politics (magazine), and remained so until the journal's demise in 1976. Cochran taught labor relations at the New School for Social Research and Empire State College and was a senior fellow at the Research Institute on International Change at Columbia University. He wrote six books, one of which, Labor and Communism: The Conflict that Shaped American Unions (1977), was nominated for a Pulitzer Prize. He died from cancer the summer of 1984 before the re-launch of New Politics in the mid-1980s.

== Notable works ==
- Prospects of American radicalism New York, N.Y. : American Socialist Publications, 1954
- American Labor in Midpassage, Monthly Review Press, 1959 (editor and contributor).
- The Cross of the Moment, Macmillan, 1961.
- The War System: An Analysis of the Necessity for Political Reason, Macmillan, 1965.
- Adlai Stevenson, Patrician Among the Politicians, Funk & Wagnalls, 1969.
- Harry Truman and the Crisis Presidency, Funk & Wagnalls, 1973, ISBN 0-308-10044-1.
- Labor and Communism: The Conflict that Shaped American Unions, Princeton University Press, 1977, ISBN 0-691-04644-1.
- Welfare Capitalism — and After, Schocken Books, 1984, ISBN 0-8052-3868-9.
- Through the Rearview Mirror: Past Book Reviews on Still Present Social Issues, Times Two Publishing, 2005, ISBN 1-930077-75-0. (A collection of book reviews, published posthumously.)
