= Harry Braverman =

American economist (1920–1976)

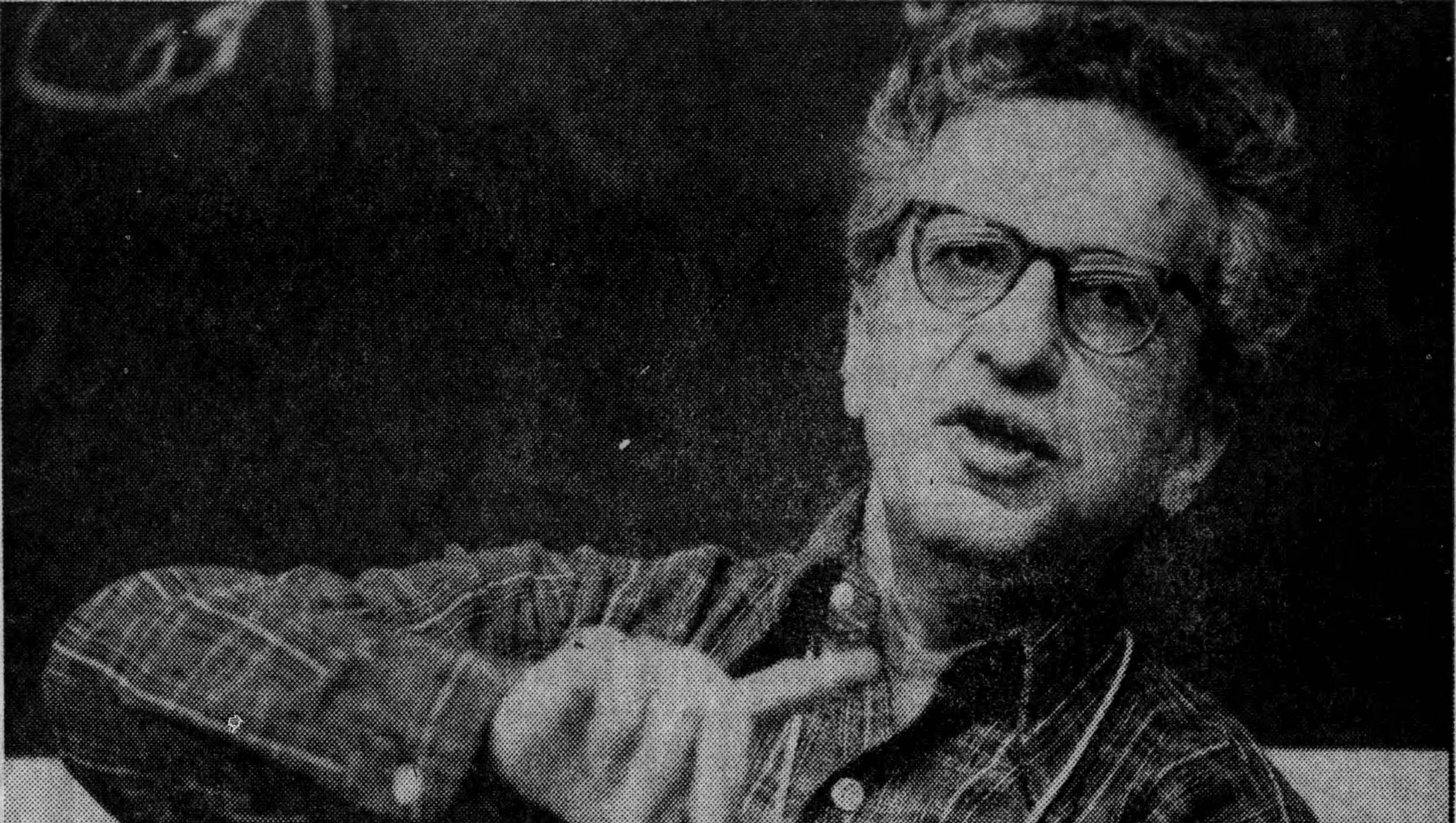
- Braverman in 1975
- Born: December 9, 1920; New York City, New York, US
- Died: August 2, 1976 (aged 55); Honesdale, Pennsylvania, US
- Known for: Labor and Monopoly Capital: The Degradation of Work in the Twentieth Century

Harry Braverman (December 9, 1920 – August 2, 1976) was an American Marxist, worker, political economist and revolutionary. Born in New York City to a working-class family, Braverman worked in a variety of metal smithing industries before becoming an editor at Grove Press, and later Monthly Review Press, where he worked until his death at the age of 55 in Honesdale, Pennsylvania. Braverman is most widely known for his 1974 book Labor and Monopoly Capital: The Degradation of Work in the Twentieth Century,[3] "a text that literally christened the emerging field of labor process studies" and which in turn "reinvigorated intellectual sensibilities and revived the study of the work process in fields such as history, sociology, economics, political science, and human geography."[4]:33 The work's profound impact on industrial sociology was formally recognized when it won the 1974 C. Wright Mills Award from the Society for the Study of Social Problems.

== Political struggle and development ==
Braverman was one of the many thousands of industrial workers who became radicalized by the events of the Great Depression. He spent his early career working as a highly skilled coppersmith and pipefitter in naval shipyards (including the Brooklyn Navy Yard) and the steel industry. His firsthand experience of craft autonomy on the shop floor—and his observation of its systematic erosion by management—would later form the empirical foundation for his sociological theories on the capitalist labor process. He first became politically active in the Young People's Socialist League (YPSL), whose members were known as "Yipsels." Despite being largely composed of students and young radicals, the Yipsels openly dissented from the positions of the established communist groups, taking a firm stance on the need for socialist internationalism (in connection with the Spanish Civil War), providing enthusiastic support for worker uprisings and the formation of the CIO (Congress of Industrial Organizations), and roundly rejecting Stalinist politics and distortions. Braverman was not afraid of unpopular positions. He sought repeatedly to deepen socialist politics by dispensing with simplistic formulations of Marxian theory. "Marxism," Braverman cautioned, "is not a ready-made slot-machine dogma, but a broad theory of social development which requires application and re-interpretation in every period."

=== Agitating during the Red Scare ===
After serving in the shipbuilding industry during World War II, Braverman began to deepen his commitment to revolutionary struggle, joining the first Trotskyist party in the United States: the Socialist Workers Party (SWP). His political engagement coincided the wave of political repression against socialists and communists known as the Red Scare. Even before the end of World War II, 18 SWP leaders were imprisoned, becoming "the first victims of the notorious Smith Act, which made it a crime of treason to publish and proclaim the ideas of Marx, Engels, Lenin, and Trotsky." Braverman himself was fired from his job at Republic Steel as a result of red-baiting tactics used by the FBI. Undeterred by the witch-hunts, Braverman continued his political work but disguised his activities by writing under the pseudonym "Harry Frankel". This forced exile from the industrial shop floor ultimately pushed Braverman to transition out of the physical trades and into the publishing industry.

=== Socialist Unity ===
In the 1950s, Braverman was one of the leaders of the so-called "Cochranite tendency", a current led by Bert Cochran (who used the pseudonym "E. R. Frank") within the broader SWP. Braverman participated to some extent in the sectarian politics prevalent among the various Trotskyist tendencies. However, after being expelled from the SWP in 1953, Braverman helped to found The Socialist Union—an explicit attempt to transcend sectarian politics and develop a broad left program focused on the U.S. Braverman became editor of The American Socialist (previously The Educator), the publication of The Socialist Union. It was in these pages that Braverman first began to think more concretely about labor, the labor process, machinery and class consciousness—what would become the key themes of Labor and Monopoly Capital just over a decade later.

=== From metal worker to editor ===
During the early 1960s, Harry Braverman worked as an editor for Grove Press, where he was instrumental in publishing The Autobiography of Malcolm X. In 1967 Braverman became managing director of Monthly Review Press, a position which he continued for the rest of his life. The editors of Monthly Review, Paul Baran and Paul Sweezy, and particularly their book Monopoly Capital, had a significant influence on Braverman as he was developing his analysis of the labor process of twentieth-century capitalism.

== Revolutionary theory as a "tool for combat" ==
=== Labor and Monopoly Capital ===
Braverman's criticism of the labor process of monopoly capitalism has had a lasting impact on the sociology of work and labor relations. In his book Labour and Monopoly Capital, Braverman extended Marx's writings on the impact of capitalist industrial growth on the labor process, paying specific attention to the growth of giant corporations and oligopolistic industries. Marx saw that the emergence of machinery and the increasing workers' control over the labor process since workers' skills shifted into tending the machines. This was seen as strengthening the owners of capital since they controlled the knowledge and skills needed to operate the factory, run the machines, and employ the workforce. This argument was furthered by Braverman who contended that such a labor force was defined by a weakened position relative to capital. Work became transformed from being a utilization of skills and experience into a mindless, machine-based, and powerless activity. He summarized the tenets of scientific management developed by Frederick Taylor as 1. disassociation of the labor process from the skills of workers, 2. separation of conception from execution, 3. use of monopoly power over knowledge to control each step of the labor process and its mode of execution. Braverman argued that Taylor's prescriptions for the workplace were "nothing less than the explicit verbalization of the capitalist mode of production". This theoretical framework was deeply informed by Braverman's own lived experience as a coppersmith and pipefitter, where he personally witnessed the systematic deskilling and loss of cognitive autonomy that occurs when physical trades are subjected to scientific management.

== See also ==
- Industrial sociology
- Social criticism
