= Industrialisti =

Finnish-language newspaper

- Publisher: Industrailist Pub. Co
- Founded: 1917
- Ceased publication: 1975
- Political alignment: Industrial Unionism in America
- Language: Finnish
- Headquarters: Duluth
- City: Duluth
- Country: United States
- OCLC number: 9832033

Industrialisti was a Finnish-language newspaper published from Duluth, Minnesota, United States. Founded in 1914 under the name Sosialisti, the newspaper was politically linked to the Industrial Workers of the World. It was published daily, but was converted into a fortnightly in its later years.

== History ==
Sosialisti had emerged in the back-drop of the 1913 copper and ore-dock strike. The 1913 strike had caused division amongst the Finnish socialists in Minnesota. They were now divided between a 'political' wing who wanted to focus on electoral struggles (through the Socialist Party of America) and those who favoured direct action. The split culminated at the annual conference of the socialist Työmies Publishing Company in the summer of 1914. At the conference, a heterogeneous coalition of political radicals and pro-direct action/pro-IWW unionists broke away and set up the publishing company behind Sosialisti.

In 1916 the name of the newspaper was changed to Teollisuustyöläinen. In 1917 a lawsuit was levelled against the newspaper. It would re-appear under the new name Industrialisti. By this time, the paper was completely under the control of the IWW faction. The newspaper was strongly opposed to the U.S. participation in the First World War. For example, the first issue of the refounded Industrialisti in March 1917 carried a strong anti-war message. Leo Laukki was the Industrialisti editor at the time.

At the time of its foundation, Sosialisti had a circulation of around 4,000. As of 1919 Industrialisti had around 10,000 subscribers. The newspaper had a sizeable readership across the border in Canada.

Industrialisti was published by a publishing cooperative, the Workers' Publishing Company (which also published Finnish-language IWW literature). It began as Socialist Publishing Company in 1914. After the 1917 lawsuit, it re-appeared as the Workers' Socialist Publishing Company, changing its name to Workers' Publishing Company in 1954.

Industrialisti was shut down in 1975. When it was closed down, it was one of the last non-English publications of the IWW.
