= West Side School =

Historic school in Wyoming, United States

- U.S. National Register of Historic Places
- Location within Wyoming Location within the United States
- Location: 100 South 3rd St., Worland, Wyoming
- Coordinates: 44.016484°N 107.965465°W
- Built: 1936
- Architect: Leon Goodrich
- Architectural style: WPA Art Deco
- NRHP reference No.: 100007002
- Added to NRHP: November 17, 2021

The West Side School is a school building constructed in Worland, Wyoming, United States, in 1936. The school was built by the Works Progress Administration to for the education of Mexican students in the region. The school remained segregated for Mexican students until 1956, in the immediate aftermath of Brown v. Board of Education.

The West Side School was listed on the National Register of Historic Places in 2021.
