= The Food Network Awards =

The Food Network Awards are a United States television production awards ceremony, focused on giving awards to chefs, cities, restaurants, and other notable food related institutions.

The first ever Food Network Awards took place as part of the Food Network South Beach Wine and Food Festival in Miami on February 23, 2007. Emeril Lagasse served as Master of Ceremonies for this awards show honoring achievements in the world of food and entertaining. The event was taped live at the festival and aired on the Food Network April 15, 2007.

== Categories ==
- Favorite Comfort Food Combo (Viewers’ Choice)
- Most Delicious Destination
- Best Ball Park Eats (Viewers’ Choice)
- Play With Your Food: Artwork With an Edible Twist
- Icy Innovations, awarded to innovators in the world of frozen treats
- Tasty Technology, (as above)
- Professional Grade Kitchen Appliance You Can't Live Without (Viewers’ Choice)
- Hot Chocolate List
- Food Hall of Fame: Tribute to Julia Child, television and food pioneer
- Share Our Strength Food Humanitarian Award
- Culinary Dreams Can Come True
- Favorite Childhood Classics (Viewers’ Choice)
- Not Your Grandmother's Food of the Month Club, given to the most unusual food of the month club
- SUPER Market
- Best Better Burger
- Favorite Coolest Cocktail (Viewers’ Choice)
- Edible Entrepreneurs
- Funniest Food Festival

== See also ==
- Food Network
