= Cleaners and Allied Independent Workers Union =

British trade union

Logo of the CAIWU

The Cleaners and Allied Independent Workers Union (CAIWU) is an independent grassroots trade union which represents cleaners in Britain.

The CAIWU was founded in 2016. Since 2021, the union has been led by its General Secretary, Alberto Durango. As of December 2023, CAIWU had 1,830 members.

The union mainly organises precarious migrant workers, with around 90% of the CAIWU's members being immigrant workers, the majority of which are Latin Americans.

In 2024, the CAIWU criticised the Starmer ministry for renegading on a promise to end outsourcing.

José García Oliva created the Latin American Protest Archive, which included protest materials such as posters, leaflets and placards created by members for CAIWU campaigns.

== See also ==
- Trade unions in the United Kingdom
