= Metal and Machinery Workers Industrial Union =

Former trade union of the United States

- Merged into: Mechanics Educational Society of America
- Founded: 1907
- Dissolved: 1950
- Location: United States of America
- Key people: Frank Cedervall
- Affiliations: Industrial Workers of the World, Congress of Industrial Organizations
- Website: Link

The Metal and Machinery Workers Industrial Union No. 440 (MMWIU) was a labor union in the United States which existed from 1907 to 1950. It organized workers in the manufacturing industry and was affiliated with the Industrial Workers of the World (IWW).

== Origins ==
The earliest recorded local of the MMWIU was in Bridgeport, Connecticut in 1907. A number of machinists' locals were also active under the IWW around that time, which dated from a period when a large number of craft union locals were switching their affiliation to the IWW, and whose organizational structure did not fit the IWW's vision of industrial unionism. Machinist locals existed in Kansas, Illinois, Massachusetts, New York, Pennsylvania, Virginia, Connecticut, Ohio, and Hamilton, Ontario. However, these were for the most part simple descriptive labels attached to IWW branches, and it would be some time before an international MMWIU administration would be formed, which would allow the union to begin to operate as a subsidiary organization under the IWW, rather than as a direct part of it.

== Cleveland branch ==
The IWW had organized in Ohio since 1905. By 1907, there was an active MMWIU local in Cleveland, as well as a separate Machinists' branch which would exist for the next ten years, until 1917. Other metal and machinery locals were scattered throughout Ohio, in towns and cities such as Fostoria, Cincinnati, and Toledo. Its most ambitious work, however, was undertaken with the leadership of Frank and Tor Cedervall, who were to become the chief organizer of the MMWIU and Cleveland branch secretary, respectively. The Cedervalls tempered the IWW's long-ranging revolutionary vision with a focus on membership retention, addressing "bread and butter" issues like wages, and attempting to win recognition of union shops. Joining in 1931, a low period for the IWW when it had begun to enter a long-term decline after the E-P split, the Cedervalls had within six years built up a Cleveland local with 3000 members, making it the most powerful IWW local in the United States. This local was built up through years of strikes, with the greatest number of strike actions between 1933 and 1940.

Inevitably, then, the national MMWIU's fates would be bound up with the fate of its Cleveland membership, which boasted a presence at the Ohio Foundry Company, the Draper Manufacturing Company, the Cochrane Brass Company, the American Stove Company (Dangler Division), Cleveland Wire & Spring, and National Screw.

== Decline ==
With the passing of the Taft-Hartley Act in 1947, the MMWIU was faced with a dilemma. The Act contained explicit anti-communist provisions (later found to be unconstitutional) and banned many of the IWW's key tactics, such as secondary strikes. Unions which refused to abide by these provisions were threatened with having all legal recognition for them vanish, and shops they had organized be brought under the legal jurisdiction of unions which did sign the anti-communist pledge. The international leadership of the IWW decisively refused to sign the pledge, which meant that all subsidiary unions, including the MMWIU (then the largest industrial union in the IWW) would face the serious threat of raiding from AFL and CIO unions. However, other unions, such as UE and Mine-Mill (the latter a former IWW affiliate), whose leadership did sign the pledge, would face raiding after their expulsion from the CIO, making the pledge questionable insurance at best.

Frank Cedervall, a proponent of signing the pledge for tactical reasons, then advocated that the MMWIU should disaffiliate from the IWW, as the Lumber Workers Industrial Union had as a result of the E-P split in 1924. He succeeded in leading the 1500-member Cleveland local out of the IWW, to found an independent, single-local MMWIU. This move would tear the IWW-affiliated MMWIU apart and lead to it quickly going defunct, due to the inability of its remaining membership to sustain it.

The Cedervall-led MMWIU would not stay independent long, as it would briefly affiliate with the CIO and rename itself to the Metal and Machinery Workers of America, before merging in 1954 with the Mechanics Educational Society of America, an independent union which itself had been under serious attack by the CIO before eventually affiliating with the CIO itself later that year.

== Attempted revival ==
In 1974, the Chicago branch of the IWW started up a Metal and Machinery Workers Organizing Committee, which launched failed organizing drives at several small metal shops in the city. The committee persisted, however, and ran an organizing drive at Mid-American Machinery in Virden, Illinois. With a majority of worker at Mid-American signing up as members of the union, management instated a lock-out, lawsuits against the union, and firing of several union members. Despite legal as well as direct action tactics (such as picketing equipment sales auctions and a three-month strike in 1978), the campaign dragged on until 1980, when the National Labor Relations Board forced management to negotiate with the union. By this point no union members were left at the shop, as all had either been fired or had moved on to other work, and the campaign failed.

Since then, there have been no significant recorded MMWIU campaigns and the union lies defunct. The Industrial Workers of the World still lists an industrial classification metal and machinery workers under its Department of Manufacture and General Production, which keeps the possibility open for new MMWIU branches being chartered. The union's papers are for the most part archived at the Walter P. Reuther Library in Detroit.
