= National Federation of Independent Unions =

The National Federation of Independent Unions (also known as the Confederated Unions of America) was a group of independent labor unions not affiliated with the American Federation of Labor (AFL) or the Congress of Industrial Organizations (CIO). It included a variety of unions, including the Mechanics' Educational Society of America (MESA), the United Brotherhood of Welders, Cutters and Helpers of America, the Western Electric Independent Labor Federation, and the National Brotherhood of Packinghouse Workers. Formed in 1942, it sought to create a voice in Washington for independent unionism, particularly on the National War Labor Board (NWLB).

A split within the CUA created the National Independent Union Council. In 1963, the two organizations reunited to form the NFIU, a body with an emphasis on what they term "independent unionism": individual, independent unions with "[t]he right to all the benefits of independence, including total autonomy [and] local treasury control." It affiliated with the Laborers' International Union of North America (LIUNA), AFL–CIO, under terms of extreme autonomy which allow the union to offer members the "rights, benefits and privileges of AFL–CIO membership and its Union Privilege Program" while preserving (for better or worse) their tradition of the independence and autonomy of constituent bodies. Since then, LIUNA briefly left the AFL–CIO to join the Change to Win Federation, then decided to leave Change to Win and resume affiliation with the AFL–CIO.
