= Industrial sociology =

Branch of the discipline of sociology

Industrial sociology, until recently a crucial research area within the field of sociology of work, examines "the direction and implications of trends in technological change, globalization, labour markets, work organization, managerial practices and employment relations" to "the extent to which these trends are intimately related to changing patterns of inequality in modern societies and to the changing experiences of individuals and families", and "the ways in which workers challenge, resist and make their own contributions to the patterning of work and shaping of work institutions".

== Labour process theory ==
One branch of industrial sociology is labour process theory (LPT). In 1974, Harry Braverman wrote Labor and Monopoly Capital, which provided a critical analysis of scientific management. This book analysed capitalist productive relations from a Marxist perspective. Following Marx, Braverman argued that work within capitalist organizations was exploitative and alienating, and therefore workers had to be coerced into servitude. For Braverman the pursuit of capitalist interests over time ultimately leads to deskilling and routinization of the worker. The Taylorist work design is the ultimate embodiment of this tendency.

Braverman demonstrated several mechanisms of control in both the factory blue-collar and clerical white-collar labour force. His key contribution is his "deskilling" thesis. Braverman argued that capitalist owners and managers were incessantly driven to deskill the labour force to lower production costs and ensure higher productivity. Deskilled labour is cheap and above all easy to control due to the workers' lack of direct engagement in the production process. In turn work becomes intellectually or emotionally unfulfilling; the lack of capitalist reliance on human skill reduces the need of employers to reward workers in anything but a minimal economic way.

Braverman's contribution to the sociology of work and industry (i.e., industrial sociology) has been important and his theories of the labour process continue to inform teaching and research. Braverman's thesis has, however, been contested, notably by Andrew Freidman in his work Industry and Labour (1977). In it, Freidman suggests that whilst the direct control of labour is beneficial for the capitalist under certain circumstances, a degree of "responsible autonomy" can be granted to unionized or "core" workers, in order to harness their skill under controlled conditions. Also, Richard Edwards showed in 1979 that although hierarchy in organizations has remained constant, additional forms of control (such as technical control via email monitoring, call monitoring; bureaucratic control via procedures for leave, sickness etc.) have been added to gain the interests of the capitalist class versus the workers. Duncan Gallie has shown how important it is to approach the question of skill from a social class perspective. In his study, the majority of non-manual, intermediate and skilled manual workers believed that their work had come to demand a higher level of skill, but the majority of manual workers felt that the responsibility and skill needed in their work had either remained constant or declined. This implies that Braverman's claims cannot be applied to all social classes.

The notion the particular type of technology workers were exposed to shapes their experience was most forcefully argued in a classic study by Robert Blauner. He argued that some work is alienating more than other types because of the different technologies workers use. Alienation, to Blauner, has four dimensions: powerlessness, meaninglessness, isolation, and self-estrangement. Individuals are powerless when they cannot control their own actions or conditions of work; work is meaningless when it gives employees little or no sense of value, interest or worth; work is isolating when workers cannot identify with their workplace; and work is self-estranging when, at the subjective level, the worker has no sense of involvement in the job.

Blauner's claims however fail to recognize that the same technology can be experienced in a variety of ways. Studies have shown that cultural differences with regard to management–union relations, levels of hierarchical control, and reward and performance appraisal policies mean that the experience of the same kind of work can vary considerably between countries and firms. The individualization of work and the need for workers to have more flexible skills in order to respond to technological changes means that Blauner's characterization of work experience is no longer valid. Additionally, workers today may work in teams to alleviate workers' sense of alienation, since they are involved in the entire process, rather than just a small part of it. In conclusion, automative technologies and computerized work systems have typically enhanced workers' job satisfaction and skill deployment in the better-paid, secure public and private sector jobs. But, in more non-skilled manual work, they have just perpetuated job dissatisfaction, especially for the many women involved in this type of work.

== See also ==
- Bibliography of sociology
- Economic sociology
- Industrial and organizational psychology
