= Taylor Society =

American scientific management society

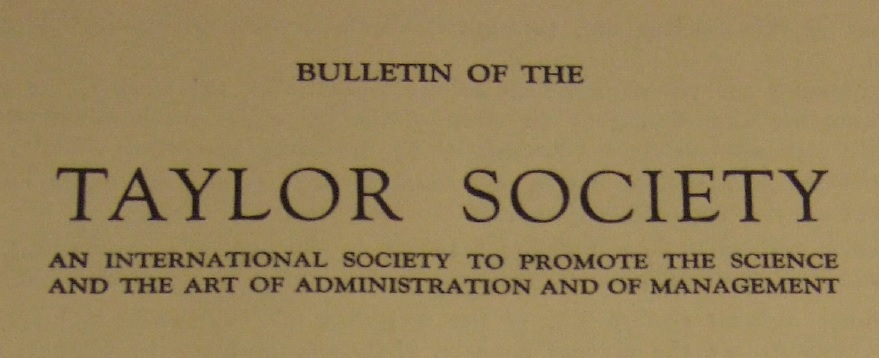
- Bulletin of the Taylor Society masthead
- Successor: Society for Advancement of Management
- Formation: 1911
- Dissolved: 1936
- Type: membership organization
- Purpose: American society for the discussion and promotion of scientific management
- Location: Initiated in 1911 at the New York Athletic Club
- Region served: United States
- Official language: English
- President: James Mapes Dodge, first president 1911-1913; et al.
- Affiliations: Society of Industrial Engineers

The Taylor Society was an American society for the discussion and promotion of scientific management, named after Frederick Winslow Taylor.

Originally named The Society to Promote The Science of Management, the Taylor Society was initiated in 1911 at the New York Athletic Club by followers of Frederick W. Taylor, including Carl G. Barth, Morris Llewellyn Cooke, James Mapes Dodge, Frank Gilbreth, H.K. Hathaway, Robert T. Kent, Conrad Lauer (for Charles Day) and Wilfred Lewis.

In 1925, the Society declared that it 'welcomes to membership all who have become convinced that "the business men of tomorrow must have the engineer-mind".' In 1936, the Taylor Society merged with the Society of Industrial Engineers forming the Society for Advancement of Management.

== Key figures and membership ==
At the entry of the United States into World War I in 1917, the Society's membership numbered around 100.

Prominent interwar members included Henri Le Châtelier, Richard A. Feiss, Henry Gantt, Lillian Gilbreth, Mary van Kleeck, William Henry Leffingwell, Harlow S. Person, Hans Renold, Oliver Sheldon, Sanford E. Thompson and Lyndall Urwick.

From 1919, the Society's permanent secretary was Harlow S. Person.

By 1925, the expanded Taylor Society had 800 members.

The Society contained people of diverse political views. One of the Society's members, Walter Polakov, was a Marxist socialist engineer who joined the Society in 1915. Polakov was a keen associate of Henry Gantt and propagated the Gantt chart in the Soviet Union in the 1920s and 1930s.

== Presidents of the Society ==
Listing of presidents of the Taylor Society:

- 1911-1913 : James Mapes Dodge
- 1913-1918 : Harlow S. Person
- 1918-1919 : John E. Otterson
- 1919-1921 : Henry S. Dennison
- 1921-1922 : Henry P. Kendall
- 1922-1924 : Richard A. Feiss, Joseph & Feiss Co., Cleveland, O.
- 1924-1925 : Percy S. Brown
- 1925-1928 : Morris Llewellyn Cooke
- 1928-1929 : Henry P. Kendall
- 1930-1932 : William Henry Leffingwell
- 1932-1933 : Sanford E. Thompson

== Activities ==
The Taylor Society received early support from the British Fabian Society.

The Society was largely responsible for the research and publication of the first biography of Frederick Wilson Taylor by Frank Copley, published in 1923.

The Taylor Society were involved in the Committee on American Participation to the Prague International Management Congress in 1924. Frank Gilbreth died prior to the conference and his wife, Lillian Moller Gilbreth, also a Taylor Society member, appeared in his place. This substitution was later made famous by the movie Cheaper by the Dozen (1950).

It had close connections with the Geneva-based International Management Institute (IMI) and International Labour Organization (ILO). From 1928 until its closure in 1933, the IMI was headed by Taylor Society member Lyndall Urwick.

== Bulletin of the Taylor Society ==
The Society's regular periodical was the Bulletin of the Taylor Society, full editions of which can be found in the F.W. Taylor archive at the Stevens Institute of Technology in Hoboken, New Jersey. Its successor publication was the Bulletin of the Society of the Advancement of Management.

A 1914–1934 index of articles from the Bulletin, and many Bulletin articles, is in Donald Del Mar and Rodger D. Collons, Classics in Scientific Management: a Book of Readings (University of Alabama Press, c.1976).

== Engagement with the Bedaux System ==
Initially, the Taylor Society appears to have been unperturbed by the Bedaux System and its Bedaux Unit: in 1927 a discussion of the Bedaux Point System appeared in the Society's Bulletin without additional comment.

However, its approach to Bedaux became more antagonistic. In 1929, the Society supported Southern textile workers in their strike against the Bedaux System, which textile workers believed was 'even worse than the old "Taylor Stop-Watch System"'.

Soon after the dissolution of the Taylor Society, its long-standing secretary Harlow S. Person responded to the Charles Bedaux & Duke of Windsor November 1937 fiasco by stating that the Taylor System, which required much management restructuring, and the Bedaux System, which could be applied 'as is', were 'poles apart'.

In 1940, C. Bertrand Thompson criticised Bedaux as a 'time study merchant', claiming that one of Bedaux's clients told him that 'if they had found my machines bolted upside down to the ceiling, they would have left them there and time studied them just the same'.

== Society for Advancement of Management ==
In 1936 the Taylor Society merged with the Society of Industrial Engineers forming the Society for Advancement of Management (SAM). International presidents of the society have been:

- 1936-1937: Ordway Tead
- 1937-1939: William H. Gesell
- 1939-1941: Myron H. Clark
- 1941-1942: Keith Louden
- 1942-1944: Percy S. Brown
- 1944-1946: Raymond R. Zimmerman
- 1946-1947: Harold B. Maynard
- 1947-1948: William L. McGrath
- 1948-1949: Charles C. James
- 1949-1951: Dillard E. Bird
- 1951-1952: Leon J. Dunn
- 1952-1953: Edward W. Jochim
- 1953-1954: Bruce Payne
- 1954-1955: George B. Estes
- 1955-1956: Frank F. Bradshaw
- 1956-1957: John B. Joynt
- 1957-1958: Homer E. Lunken
- 1958-1959: Phil Carroll
- 1959-1960: Dause L. Bibby
- 1960-1961: James E. Newsome
- 1961-1962: Robert B. Curry
- 1962-1963: Fred E. Harrel
- 1963-1964: Hezz Stringfield Jr.
- 1964-1965: William R. Divine
- 1965-1966: Oliver J. Sizelove
- 1966-1967: Donald B. Miller
- 1967-1968: James L. Centner
- 1968-1969: David N. Wise
- 1969-1970: Jack E. Wiedemer
- 1970-1971: Carl W. Golgart
- 1971-1972: Owen A. Paul
- 1972-1973: Ernest T. Tierney
- 1973-1974: Warren G. Orr
- 1974-1975: James W. Bumbaugh
- 1975-1976: Hal J. Batten
- 1976-1977: W. H. Kirby Jr.
- 1977-1978: A. T. Kindling
- 1978-1979: James J. Rutherford
- 1979-1980: John S. McGuinness
- 1980-1981: Clifford J. Doubek
- 1981-1983: Tony Brown
- 1983-1986: Moustafa H. Abdelsamad
- 1986-1987: Thomas R. Greensmith
- 1987-1988: S. G. Fletcher

One of the main task of the Society for Advancement of Management was the recognition of achievements in the advancement of management. Fot that, the society had initiated an Award Program, which contained the Taylor Key Award, the Human Relations Award, the Gilbreth Medal, the Materials Handling Award, the Phil Carroll Advancement of Management Award, the Industrial Incentives Award, and finally The SAM Service Award Honor Society.

Prominent winners of the Taylor Key Awards have been:

- Lawrence A. Appley, George W. Barnwell, Donald C. Burnham, Phil Carroll, Morris L. Cooke, Donald K. Davis, Ralph C. Davis, W. Edwards Deming, Henry S. Dennison, Hugo Diemer, M. A. Dittmer, Peter F. Drucker, H. P. Dutton, W. M. Gesell, King Hathaway, James L. Hayes, Herbert C. Hoover, Harry A. Hopf, John B. Joynt, Henry P. Kendall, Dexter S. Kimball. Axa S. Knowles, Harold Koontz, Harold B. Maynard, Robert S. McNamara, John F. Mee, Don G. Mitchell, Allan H. Mogensen, Frank Henry Neely, Kaichiro Nishino, Nobuo Noda, Harlow S. Person, Henning W. Prentis, F. J. Roethlisberger, Edward C. Schleh, Harold F. Smiddy, Brehon B. Somervell, J. Allyn Taylor, George T. Trundle Jr., Lyndall F. Urwick, and Robert B. Wolf.

== Publications ==
- Frederick W. Taylor, 'Scientific Management and Labor Unions' Bulletin of the Society to Promote the Science of Management Vol.1, No.1 (December, 1914) online at University of Oklahoma University Library
- Taylor Society, Frederick Winslow Taylor: a memorial volume; being addresses delivered at the funeral of Frederick Winslow Taylor (1915) online at Archive.org
- Harlow S. Person, 'What is the Taylor Society?' Bulletin of the Taylor Society (December 1922)
- Frank Barkley Copley, Frederick W. Taylor, Father of Scientific Management (Harper and Brothers, 1923) 2 vols. online at Archive.org
- Taylor Society, Critical Essays on Scientific Management (New York, 1925)
- Taylor Society, Union-Management Cooperation in the Railway Industry (New York, 1926)
- Harlow S. Person, Scientific Management in American Industry (Harper & Brothers, 1929) online at Archive.org
