= John Otterson =

John Otterson may refer to:

- Jack Otterson (1905–1991), American art director
- John E. Otterson (1881–1964), American engineer and business executive
