= Labor and Monopoly Capital =

1974 book by Harry Braverman

Labor and Monopoly Capital: The Degradation of Work in the Twentieth Century
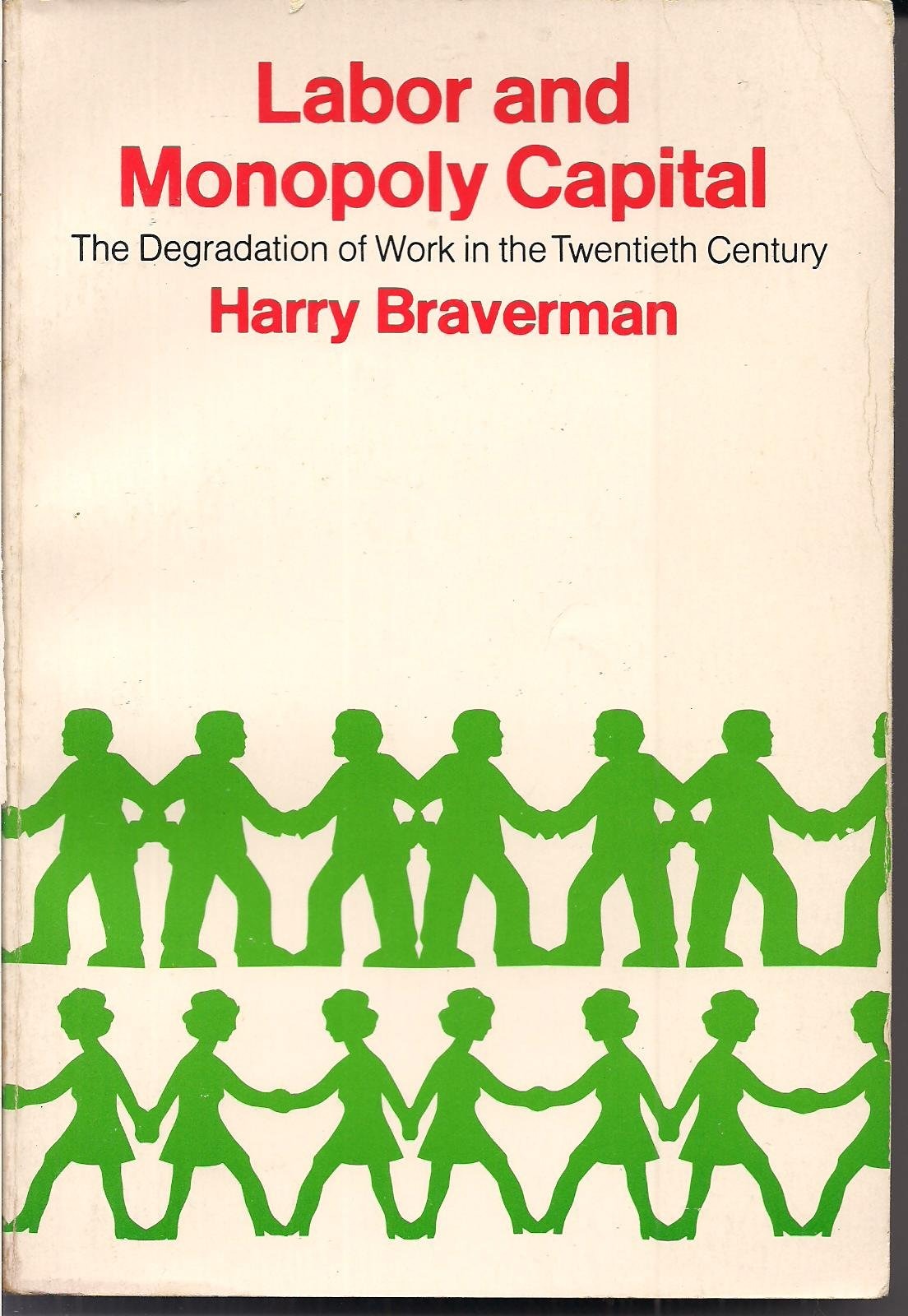
- Cover of the 1974 edition
- Authors: Harry Braverman
- Language: English
- Subject: Labor
- Publisher: Monthly Review Press
- Publication date: 1974
- Publication place: United States
- Media type: Print

Labor and Monopoly Capital: The Degradation of Work in the Twentieth Century is a book about the economics and sociology of work under monopoly capitalism by the political economist Harry Braverman. Building on Monopoly Capital by Paul A. Baran and Paul Sweezy, it was first published in 1974 by Monthly Review Press.

== Arguments ==
Intended as a direct assault on management of blue-collar labor under capitalism, Braverman's book started what came to be called, using Braverman's phraseology, "the labor process debate". This had as its focus a close examination of the nature of "skill" and the finding that there was a decline in the use of skilled labor as a result of managerial strategies of workplace control. It also outlined workers' resistance to such managerial strategies.

Specifically, Braverman subjected Frederick Winslow Taylor to intense critique, describing Taylor's strident pronouncements on management's attitudes to workers as the "explicit verbalization of the capitalist mode of production". He argued that, in the present day, the 'successors to Taylor are to be found in engineering and work design, and in top management'.

According to Braverman, Taylorism had not been superseded by more humanistic management methods, such as those of Hugo Münsterberg or Elton Mayo (as most textbooks then argued). Braverman instead argued that these 'practitioners of "human relations" and "industrial psychology"' have supplemented Taylor's influence by forming 'the maintenance crew for the human machinery'.

Braverman argued that knowledge of Taylorism's profound impact on the twentieth century workplace, and management-labor relations, was poor due to a widespread misunderstanding of the historical development of the workplace. Indeed, Braverman's book was written in an accessible fashion precisely to make it easy for workers to comprehend the huge historical and structural changes which had taken place around them.

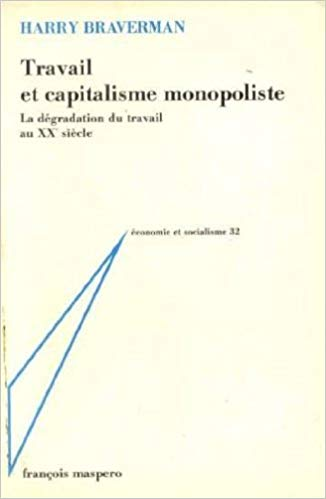
The French edition

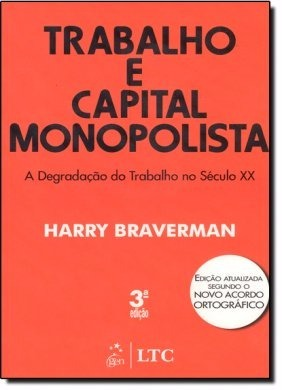
The Portuguese edition

== Key thinkers ==
Key thinkers examined in Labor and Monopoly Capital were Karl Marx, Charles Babbage, Vladimir Lenin, F. W. Taylor, Frank Gilbreth, William Henry Leffingwell, Elton Mayo, and Lyndall Urwick.

Although the book did not include new archival research, Labor and Monopoly Capital built on influential historians such as E.P. Thompson, Alfred Chandler, J.D. Bernal, David Landes, Lyndall Urwick, and E.F.L. Brech. In particular, Urwick was attacked as the 'rhapsodic historian of the scientific management movement'.

Sociological analysis was provided by such authors as Paul Sweezy, Paul A. Baran, Georges Friedmann, William Foote Whyte, and Daniel Bell.

== Impact ==
According to one source, the book sold 120,000 copies between 1974 and its 1999 reissue.

Labor and Monopoly Capital was read widely in many languages and had particular impact on scholarly debate in Britain, to the extent that one author described the phenomenon as 'Bravermania'.

Despite being overtly hostile to academic sociology, Labor and Monopoly Capital became one of the most important sociological books of its era. It revived academic interest in both the history and the sociology of workplaces setting the agenda for many subsequent historians and sociologists of the workplace.

Historical studies influenced by Labor and Monopoly Capital include research into deskilling, bureaucracy, Marxist historiography, business history, historical sociology, the Bedaux System, Bedaux Unit, and the Taylor Society.

Some authors including David F. Noble thought Braverman was overly pessimistic about how subordinated to capital labor had become, and produced case studies as to how workers had resisted management interventions at the point of production.

Several historians have responded to Labor and Monopoly Capital by revealing through archival research that the Taylor Society had been far more liberal than Braverman suggested Taylor's long-term influence had been. The Taylor Society even included a small number of Marxists such as Walter Polakov.

== The Great Recession and Taylorism 2.0 ==
Amidst the aftermath of the Great Recession, on Labor Day 2009, the Wall Street Journal declared Labor and Monopoly Capital to be number one among the 'Five Best Books on Working'.

Like Baran and Sweezy's Monopoly Capital, Braverman's book made a comeback during the Great Recession and debates on the composition of the contemporary working class and 'Taylorism 2.0'. Some commentators including the Financial Times argued that digital technology afforded managers a new chance to subordinate labor to capital, but added that digital technology also offered workers new forms of organization and resistance.

== See also ==
- History of economic thought
- Marxism
- Monopoly Capitalism
