= Feiss =

Feiss is a surname. Notable people with this surname include:

- David Feiss (born 1959), American animator
- Ellen Feiss, known for her involvement in Switch
- Richard A. Feiss (1878–1954), American lawyer
