= Digital Taylorism =

Management style

Digital Taylorism, also known as New Taylorism, is a modern take on the management style known as classic Taylorism or scientific management. Digital Taylorism is based on maximizing efficiency by standardizing and routinizing the tools and techniques for completing each task involved with a given job. Digital Taylorism involves management's use of technology to monitor workers and make sure they are employing these tools and techniques at a satisfactory level.

== Influences on the workplace ==
As a result of the continually changing workforce, Digital Taylorism can be found in many organizations. One example of this is grocery industry. In the Australian grocery industry, the supplier, transporter, warehouse, and retailer all use Digital Taylorism to go about everyday tasks and monitor workers. Employers believe this is the best way to be the most efficient, least costly, and most productive.

School systems are also using this method of New Taylorism to better the students and faculty. Schools are finding new ways to make sure students are being taught the most efficient methods in order to succeed and meet the standards. New Taylorism can be seen through the written curriculum in schools in the United States.

Another example of Digital Taylorism being used in the workplace is found in organizations who use surveillance systems to monitor workers and make sure they are on task at all times; the percentage of surveillance being used in the workplace is continually growing. Phones and computers that employees use at work are being monitored in order to make sure everything is being done in the most efficient way. Workflow management system can be viewed as a form of Digital Taylorism. For instance, marketing automation can be integrated into customer relationship management to reduce and replace the need for human labour. Even so, such system or technologies are not meant to replace human work but instead designed to intuitively solve human needs, such that they can better focus on the bigger picture and the important aspects.

== Criticisms ==
The term 'Digital Taylorism' is multi-faceted and directly related to Taylorism. Therefore, due to some unfavorable perceptions of Taylorism, Digital Taylorism has some criticisms as well. For example, Taylorism is infamous for meaningless work because employees are simply treated as machines. This may be shown in the deskilling of workers, though this is not always the case. Also, standards may be enforced much more strictly due to the technological advancements. This may be found in more stringent adherence of relaxation and meal breaks, reduced systemic overtime, and an increase in direct supervision. In turn, these leads to much more work measurement. It is the opposite of what kinds of work environments that many organizations are currently adjusting to.

Digital Taylorism is criticized for giving management an extreme form of domination, therefore leading to repression in some circumstances. Every motion can be potentially watched, studied, and controlled by the boss. Already, 80% of the corporations in the United States have their employees under regular surveillance and this number is growing. For instance, in fields such as education, teachers may feel that the methods determined by the administration to standardize classes is because they are not capable of doing so themselves. Students may be seen as the goods being produced, therefore losing the personal characteristics of classroom interactions and learning. This has the potential to disempower and/or deskill the teachers. Digital Taylorism can be seen in standardized testing, which is common across America.

Digital Taylorism also has its limitations. Based on Taylorism, most research concerning Digital Taylorism is simply based on time and motion studies to reveal improvement, rather than employee satisfaction. The results measured only involve quantitative methodologies. Though quantitative research is essential, it is not sufficient for providing the answers to questions concerning usability for example. Additionally, Digital Taylorism may be seen as overstepping its place for management. These new technologies may be crossing the line by intervening before anything results in significant industrial disputation. Instead, organizations are disciplining workers who simply do not meet the quota or standards.
