= Wilhelm Kalveram =

German professor of business administration

Wilhelm Kalveram (26 March 1882 in Essen - 15 January 1951 in Frankfurt am Main) was a German professor of business administration.

Kalveram studied state and financial sciences and earned a degree in business administration in 1922 from the University of Frankfurt am Main. He was a student of business economist Fritz Schmidt. He worked as an adjunct professor teaching for banking management, industrial management, accounting and business ethics.

Kalveram believed that scientific management had the ultimate goal of increasing productivity and living standards, and lead to new employment opportunities: "The rationalisation of office operations, if it is carried out in the proper spirit, has to result in an increase in per capita productivity and the living standards of the general population and therefore lead to new employment opportunities."

Kalveram was co-editor of the journals of Business Research and Practice (Betriebswirtschaftliche Forschung und Praxis, BFuP) and Journal of Marketing (Zeitschrift für Betriebswirtschaft, ZfB).

Post-1945, Kalveram was among the most important German workers on industrial management and its human dimensions.

== Works ==
- Organisation und Technik des bankmäßigen Kontokorrentgeschäfts (1933).
- Bankbetriebslehre (1939).
- Grundsätzliches zur Methode des Leistungsvergleichs (1944).
- Kaufmännisches Rechnen (2. Aufl. 1938).
