= Henry P. Kendall =

American businessman

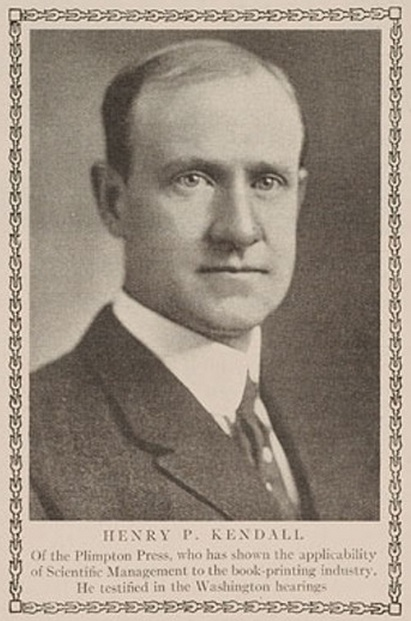
Henry P. Kendall from The American Magazine, May 1911

Henry Plimpton Kendall (January 15, 1878 – November 3, 1959) was a New England entrepreneur, industrialist, and philanthropist from Walpole, Massachusetts. He is considered one of the pioneers of scientific management.

== Early life ==
Kendall was born in 1878 in Charlestown, Massachusetts, son of Henry Lucien Kendall and Clara Idella (Plimpton) Kendal. After attending the Lawrenceville School, boarding schools in New Jersey, he graduated from Amherst College in Massachusetts in 1899.

== Career ==
After his graduation in 1899, he started his career at the Plimpton Press company in Norwood, Massachusetts, a company owned by his uncle Herbert Mosley Plimpton (1859–1948). He worked his way up from a minor position to general manager and treasurer in 1910. In this period he had grown an interest in the scientific management techniques of Frederick Winslow Taylor, which he had applied in the Plimpton Press plant. Kendall believed that industrial plants could become efficient when viewed as systems composed of interacting parts but become more efficient in the long-run if the scientific-management philosophy was fully accepted by all parties. This became one of the earliest successful applications of the Taylor system.

In 1903, Henry P. Kendall took over the Lewis Batting Company.

Kendall acquired and founded many textile factories and other companies through his company, the Kendall Company, which emphasized product research and scientific processes.

His company produced products such as Curity Diapers and Curad finger bandages (those brands are now owned by Covidien and Medline Industries, respectively). He first turned around the Lewis Manufacturing Company in Walpole and then purchased the manufacturing village of Slatersville, Rhode Island. His management was noted for social responsibility and was known for his view that business leadership and industrial management must not only excel in technical management but also ensure industrial communities had healthy social conditions. Kendall Company produced textiles for the government and Red Cross during World War I and expanded throughout the twentieth century acquiring manufacturing facilities in the United States and Mexico.

Kendall eventually acquired and founded many textile factories and other companies through his company, the Kendall Company, which emphasized product research and scientific processes. In 1972 the Kendall Company became a wholly owned subsidiary of Colgate-Palmolive.

In April 1994, Tyco Healthcare purchased the Kendall Company. In 2007, Tyco Healthcare spun off as Covidien.

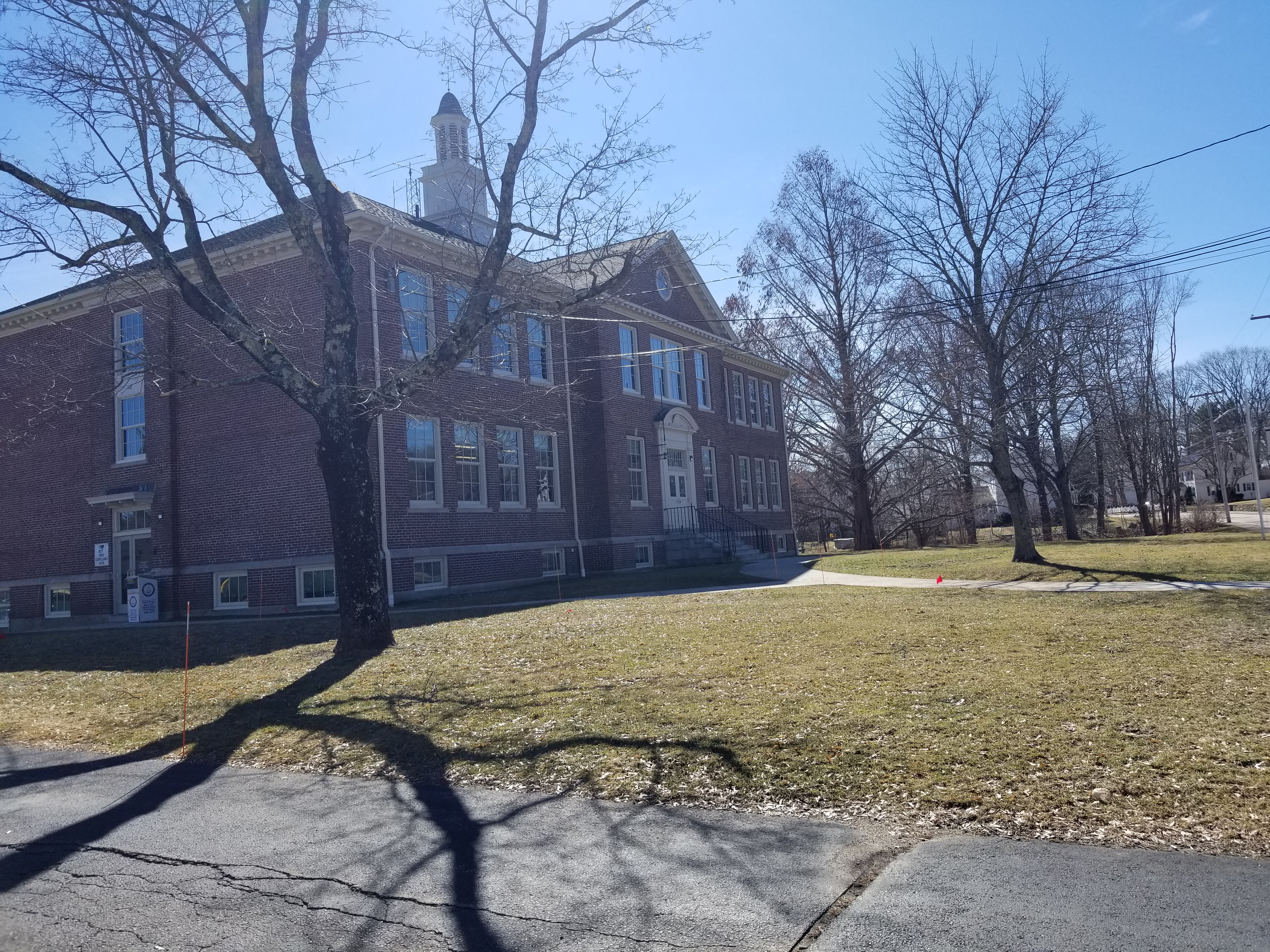
Former Kendall Dean School in Slatersville, Rhode Island

== Personal life ==
Kendall was married to Evelyn Louise Way (1893–1979), and they had three children including Henry Way Kendall (1926-1999), who won the Nobel Prize in physics in 1990, and business executive John Plimpton Kendall.

Kendall was an active philanthropist. He founded the Kendall Foundation and served on the American Board of Commissioners for Foreign Missions, a Christian mission society. Kendall's property Moose Hill Farm is now an open space for the public.

Kendall died on November 3, 1959, in Sharon, Massachusetts.

== Honours ==
In 1921-22 Kendall had served as 5h president of the Taylor Society as successor of Henry S. Dennison, and was succeeded by Richard A. Feiss. In 1934 and 1935 he served as Chairman of The Business Council, then known as Business Advisory Council for the United States Department of Commerce.

In the manufacturing village of Slatersville, Rhode Island, the Kendall Dean School was named in his honor. Kendall also founded the Kendall Whaling Museum in Sharon, Massachusetts, in 1955, which in 2001 was merged with the New Bedford Whaling Museum and now forms large portions of its permanent collection.

== Selected publications ==
- James G., Dennison H., Gay E., Kendall H. and Burrit A. (1926), Profit-Sharing and Stock Ownership for Employees, Harper, New York
- Henry B. Elkind (ed.) Preventive management: mental hygiene in industry, with foreword by Henry P. Kendall, 1930.
- Early maps of Carolina and adjoining regions From the Collection of Henry P. Kendall, Boston, Mass. Camden, S.C. 1937
- Henry P Kendall, Special exhibition of the Henry P. Kendall whaling collection at the Pratt school of naval architecture and marine engineering, 1937.
- Henry P. Kendall, The Kendall Company, 50 years of Yankee enterprise!, 1953.
