= Percy S. Brown =

American businessman (1883–1973)

Percy Shiras Brown (October 15, 1883 – July 15, 1973) was an American chemical, industrial and consulting management engineer, educator, and business executive, who served as president of the Taylor Society in 1924–1925, and as president of the Society for Advancement of Management in 1942–44.

== Biography ==
=== Youth and early career ===
Brown was born in Elizabeth, New Jersey in 1883, son G. Carleton Brown and Katherine (French) Brown. Brown was brother to Carlton F. Brown, later General Manager, and to Harold McD. Brown, later Publicity Manager of the Corona Typewriter Company, in 1917, when Brown would join his two brothers in that firm.

Brown attended St. Paul's School in Concord, New Hampshire, and studied chemical engineering at the Rensselaer Polytechnic Institute. After his graduation, in 1906, he started as chemist at the Western Electric Co. in New York. Next he was General Superintendent of a prominent manufacturing company. In 1912 he returned to the Western Electric Co. where he was employed in research and efficiency work for five years.

In 1917 Brown joined the Corona Typewriter Company in Groton, New York, where he was Works Manager T. S. in 1922 and Vice President in 1924. In the year 1924-25 he also served as president of the Taylor Society as successor Richard A. Feiss, and the next year he was succeeded by Morris Llewellyn Cooke.

=== Further career and other activities ===
In the year 1926–27 he was sales manager for the Portable Adding Machine Co. In 1927 he was appointed American deputy director at the International Management Institute, in Geneva, Switzerland. In May 1928 he resigned to protest against the manipulations in the institute by its first director, Paul Dévinat.

Back in the States in 1929 he became associated with Edward A. Filene in 1929–30, and 1933–37. In between, from 1930 to 1933 in Chicago he was partner at James O. McKinsey & Co., now McKinsey & Company. In the late 1930s Brown also became board member of the Institute for Propaganda Analysis.

Later in the 1940s he served as executive director of the Edward A. Filene Good Will Fund. Also from 1942 to 1944 he served as president of the Society for Advancement of Management as successor of James Keith Louden, and was succeeded by Raymond R. Zimmerman. And in 1944 he was also secretary and treasurer of the Consumer Distribution Corp.

Brown died on July 15, 1973 at the age of 89 in Largo, Florida, where he had lived for 12 years. At the time of his death, he was the president of the Filene Goodwill Fund. His obituary in the Tampa Bay Times mentions that he had previously served as treasurer and trustee of the The Century Foundation (then known as the Twentieth Century Fund) and president of the New Hampshire Archeological Society. It also identifies him as a member of the Florida Anthropological Society, the Episcopal Church of the Good Samaritan in Largo, Lodge 47 of the Free and Accepted Masons in Groton, New York (though no such lodge appears to exist), Commandery 50 of the Knights Templar in Cortland, New York, and the Ancient Accepted Scottish Rite in Syracuse, New York.

=== Personal ===
Brown married Katherine Terry of Albany, New York on December 12, 1905. They had one daughter, named Priscilla, who would marry Irving W. Burr (1908–1989), author of Applied Statistical Methods, and recipient of the 1958 Shewhart Medal.

== Selected publications ==
- Filene, Edward Albert, Werner Karl Gabler, and Percy Shiras Brown. Next steps forward in retailing. Harper & Brothers, 1937; French translation 1939.

Articles, a selection

- Percy S Brown. "Functionalized time - study methods." Automotive Engineering, Volume 13. 1923. p. 433
- Percy S. Brown, "The Works and Aims of the Taylor Society," Annals of the American Academy of Political and Social Science (May, 1925) online at JSTOR
- Brown, Percy S., "A Few Facts about Scientific Management in Industry," American Journal of Nursing 1927, 27: 828–32.
- Percy S. Brown, "Organization of the Manufacturing Division," in Handbook of Business Administration, ed. by William J. A. Donald (New York: McGraw-Hill Book Co., Inc., for the American Management Association, 1931), p. 54
- Brown, Percy S. "Post-War Objectives in Labor Relations." Public Opinion Quarterly 7.3 (1943): 369–377.
