= Labor process theory =

Theory of labour control for capital accumulation

Labour process theory (LPT) is a Marxist theory of the organization of work under capitalism. It examines how people work, who controls their work, what skills they use in work, and how they are paid for work. Researchers in critical management studies, organization studies, and related disciplines use LPT to explain persistent conflict between employers and employees in capitalist economies, with a particular focus on deskilling, worker autonomy, and managerial control at the point of production. The modern academic subfield of labor process theory was fundamentally established by the 1974 publication of Harry Braverman's foundational text, Labor and Monopoly Capital: The Degradation of Work in the Twentieth Century.

== Background ==
In Marxian economics, the "labour process" refers to how human work transforms elements of the natural world into useful products. Labour is an interaction between the person who works and the natural world, in which materials are deliberately altered to meet human needs. The labour process is three-fold: first, the work itself, as a purposeful productive activity; second, the objects on which that work is performed; and third, the instruments which facilitate the work.

The natural world – the universal material for human labour – exists independently of human effort. Value is created when labour separates natural resources from their original form. Marx gives examples such as fish taken from water, timber derived from trees in a forest, and ore extracted from veins. Through labour, these materials become raw material. According to Marx, this process is two-way:

Labour is, in the first place, a process in which both man and nature participates and in which man of his own accord starts, regulates and controls the material reactions between himself and nature. He opposes himself to nature as one of her own forces, setting in motion arms and legs, head and hands, the natural forces of his body in order to appropriate nature's productions in a form adapted to his own wants. By thus acting on the external world and changing it, he at the same time changes his own nature.

The labour process is purposeful activity aimed at the production of value, either because an output is useful or tradeable (typically because it is useful). A surplus is generated when the value produced by labour exceeds the value of inputs. Because humans seek to improve their material conditions, labour processes exist in all societies, capitalist or socialist. However, the way labour is organized and controlled reflects the type of society in which it takes place.

== Modern applications ==
A central concern of LPT is the analysis of management systems and methods of control, and how these are used to reduce the power of workers who possess skills that cannot easily be replaced by unskilled labour or machine power.

LPT critiques scientific management as developed by Frederick Winslow Taylor in the early twentieth century and draws heavily on concepts developed by Harry Braverman in the 1970s. It is used to explain workers' bargaining power under contemporary global capitalism and has developed into a broader framework for examining exploitative management strategies. Drawing directly on his own lived experience as a working-class coppersmith and pipefitter, Braverman argued that under capitalism, management systematically reduces worker control by enforcing the "separation of conception and execution." By centralizing all planning and knowledge (conception) within management and simplifying tasks for the workers (execution), knowledge is embedded into machines and bureaucratic systems rather than the workers themselves. This process of deskilling lowers wages, increases work intensity where automation is limited, and reduces the meaningful cognitive content of work. He also discusses class consciousness, while acknowledging limitations in addressing working-class self-emancipation. Other scholars have extended this analysis by examining worker resistance to systems such as Fordism.
