= William Leffingwell =

William Leffingwell may refer to:

- William Leffingwell (Iowa politician) (1822–1884), American politician in Iowa
- William Leffingwell (New York politician) (1855–1927), American politician in New York
- William Henry Leffingwell (1876–1934), American organizational theorist
