= Wilfred Lewis =

American mechanical engineer and inventor

Wilfred Lewis (October 16, 1854 - December 29, 1929) was an American mechanical engineer, inventor, director for the machine tool firm William Sellers & Co, and later president of the Tabor Manufacturing Company. He is known for his early work on the bending of gear teeths, and his later work on scientific management. In the late 19th century Lewis had developed a bending equation, which became standard for gear design. The Lewis stress factor for gears is named after him.

== Biography ==
Born in Philadelphia, Pennsylvania, Lewis graduated from the Massachusetts Institute of Technology in 1875, and had spent his early career at the William Sellars and Company of Philadelphia. He had started his career as mechanic, draftsman, designer and assistant engineer, and had worked his way up to one of the director of the machine tool firm. By 1900 he moved to the Tabor Manufacturing Company in Philadelphia, PA, where he was appointed president and introduced the Taylor system of shop management. Over the years Lewis was a prolific inventors, who held over 50 patents. In his later life he became promoter of the Scientific management.

Lewis was vice-president of the American Society of Mechanical Engineers from 1901 to 1903. In 1910-12 Lewis was also one of the founding members of the Taylor Society, and later its president. Lewis was a recipient of the ASME Medal from the American Society of Mechanical Engineers in 1927.

Lewis died a sudden death at sea in 1929 from apoplexy near Egypt, and was buried at sea. Lewis had been taking a trip around the world after he had attended the World Engineering Congress of 1929 in Tokyo, Japan. Lewis had been married to Emily Sargent Lewis, a poet and suffragette, and they had five children.

== Work ==
=== Lewis and Scientific management ===
Lewis was a boyhood friend of Frederick Winslow Taylor, participated in the development of Taylor's work since the late 19th century, and became a promoter of scientific management in the first decennia of the 20th century. Taylor himself had developed his system of management at the Midvale Steel company. Afterwards he had introduced his system among others in the shops of the William Sellers and Company machine tool firm, sponsored by William Sellers himself, but this collapsed when Sellers retired. As one of its directors Lewis had become acquainted with Taylor's system, but this didn't make a lasting impression. About their further interaction Merkle (1980) summarized:

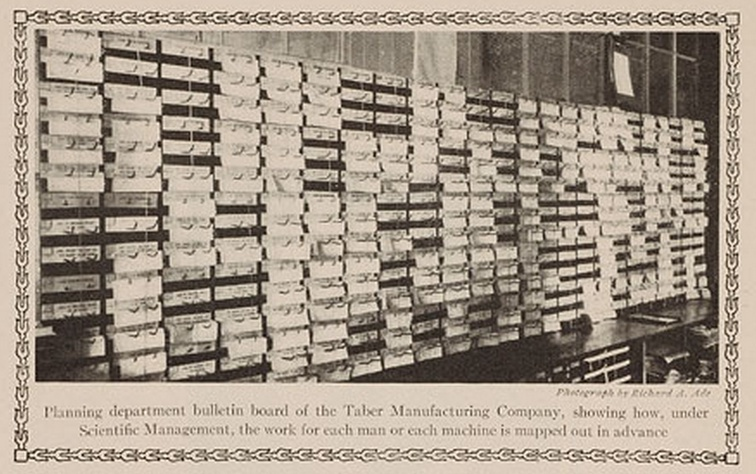
Planning department bulletin board at the Tabor manufacturing company, 1911

"...The two great showcases of Scientific Management, Tabor and Link-Belt, were not originally converted to Taylorism on the grounds of rational inquiry. Although after the Scientific Management fad had begun, the example of these two companies helped to convert other businesses to Taylorite organization, Taylorism was accepted at the Tabor Manufacturing Company as part of a debt, and at Link-Belt as part of the ideological conversion of one of Taylor's personal friends. Wilfred Lewis, a boyhood friend of Taylor, who had risen from draftsman at Sellers to become a mechanical engineer, had come to be one of the heads of the Tabor company. Shortly after 1900, Tabor started to lose money, and the process was accelerated by a series of strikes. With the new, higher wages, other companies were producing the same product at a lower cost, and the company went from selling stock to outright borrowing. Lewis went to his friends for money, among them Taylor. "Use my system," said Taylor, in effect, "or you shall have no money." In desperation, Lewis accepted, in spite of the fact that the genteel inhabitants of Philadelphia considered his friend a management crank. Straightaway, Barth, and then Taylor himself descended upon the Tabor plant, where they created the first showplace of Scientific Management..."

Over the years Wilfred Lewis became strong believer and promoter of scientific management. About one of his latest stands, Kyle and Nyland (1993) summarized:

"In December 1927 the industrialist Wilfred Lewis delivered a paper to the Taylor Society in which he lauded the achievements of the scientific management movement. Lewis claimed the four key objectives of the movement had become the reduction of costs, the raising of wages, the encouragement of collaboration between employers and employees and the full employment of workers and machinery. The extent to which these objectives were being attained, he concluded, enabled the people of "America to look forward hopefully to the future" (Lewis 1927, 557)."

About the response Kyle and Nyland (1993) summarized:

"The response to Lewis' paper indicated that not all members of the Taylor Society shared his optimism. While he was praised by some commentators, his suggestion that there was wide acceptance amongst employers of the positive value of high wages was challenged. It was also observed that his belief the good times were "practically certain to continue .... is an assumption which may well be questioned" (Muste 1928, 47)"

== Selected publications ==
- Wilfred Lewis. Machine Molding. Tabor Manufacturing Company, 1911.

Articles, a selection

- Lewis W. "Investigation of the Strength of Gear Teeth." Proceedings of the Engineers Club, Philadelphia, 1893.
- Wilfred Lewis. "Interchangeable Involute Gear Tooth Systems." Journal A.S.M.E. 1501–20. Flanders, R. E. 1910. Am. Mach., Dec. 1910, p. 1064, and Machinery, Jan. 1911, p. 307-14
- Wilfred Lewis. "An Object Lesson in Efficiency, the History of a plant for Which Scientific Management Spelled the Difference Between Success and Failure," Industrial Engineering and the Engineering Digest, 1911.
- Lewis, Wilfred 1914, "An Object Lesson in Efficiency." in: Scientific Management, edited by C.B. Thompson, Cambridge, ma: Harvard University Press. p. 233-241
- Lewis, Wilfred (1927) "Master Planks in the American Industrial Program," Bulletin of the Taylor Society, 12(6), pp 555 – 557.

Patents, a selection

- Patent US512198 - Or boring machines, 1894
- Patent US668718 - Lathe, 1900
- Patent US780512 - Saw-tooth gage, 1905
- Patent US1438184 - Fastening device for removable cutter blades, 1922
