= Arch Wilkinson Shaw =

American publisher (1876–1962)

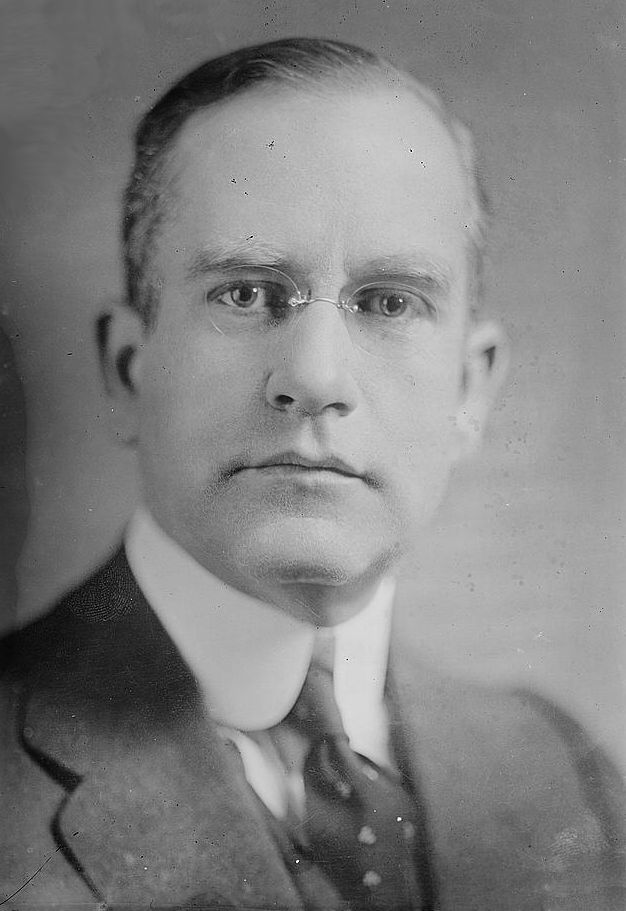
- Shaw in 1917
- Born: August 4, 1876; Jackson, Michigan, U.S.
- Died: March 9, 1962 (aged 85); Winnetka, Illinois, U.S.
- Occupation(s): Publisher, editor, management theorist
- Known for: Founder System, The Magazine of Business (1900-1927)

Arch Wilkinson Shaw (August 4, 1876 – March 9, 1962) was an American entrepreneur, publisher, editor and management theorist who applied the ideas of scientific management in the areas of offices and the tertiary sector.

During the First World War, Shaw served as Secretary of Commercial Economy Board, and later served as member of the board of directors of the Harvard Business School.

== Biography ==
=== Youth, education and early career ===
Shaw was born in 1876 in Jackson, Michigan, son of James Franklin Shaw and Estelle Jane (Fenn) Shaw. After attending public school, he quit his studies at Olivet College. He would eventually obtain his AM degree from Olivet College in 1914, and would obtain his doctor of laws from Northwestern University in 1927.

Shaw broke off his studies at the Olivet College before graduating in 1899, at the age of 23, and founded, with Louis C. Walker, the Shaw-Walker Company in Muskegon Michigan, specializing in office supplies and plugs and files.

=== Further career ===
Four years later, in 1903, while still in the board of directors of the firm, he founded the Shaw Company, which published the reviews System, The Magazine of Business, specializing in the service and offices (typing, office furniture, etc.), and Factory. The firm also published books on management. Shaw sold it in 1928 to the McGraw-Hill Company.

Shaw took a sabbatical in 1910, when his business was flourishing, to study the economy at Harvard University in Cambridge, where he especially appreciated the courses by Frank William Taussig, which demonstrated its influence later on in his writings. He also befriended the Professor of economic history Edwin Francis Gay, first dean of Harvard Business School. In 1911, Shaw became lecturer, inaugurating the first course in Business Policy, and became a member of the board of the Harvard Business School. He wrote the article Some Problems in Distribution Market, published in August 1912 in the Quarterly Journal of Economics, which became a seminal article in marketing studies. With E. Gay, he then helped found the Harvard Bureau of Business Research, which he helped to fund. He was also a shareholder and member of the board of the Kellogg Company.

Shaw argued in his books and System journal, that the federal government should be involved in the collection and data processing for business. In 1917, when the United States were about to enter war, he persuaded the Council of National Defense to create the Commercial Economy Board, of which he became the secretary. This council then became the conservation division of the War Industries Board under his responsibility.

He died in Winnetka, Illinois on March 9, 1962.

== Work ==
=== System, Magazine of business 1900-1927 ===
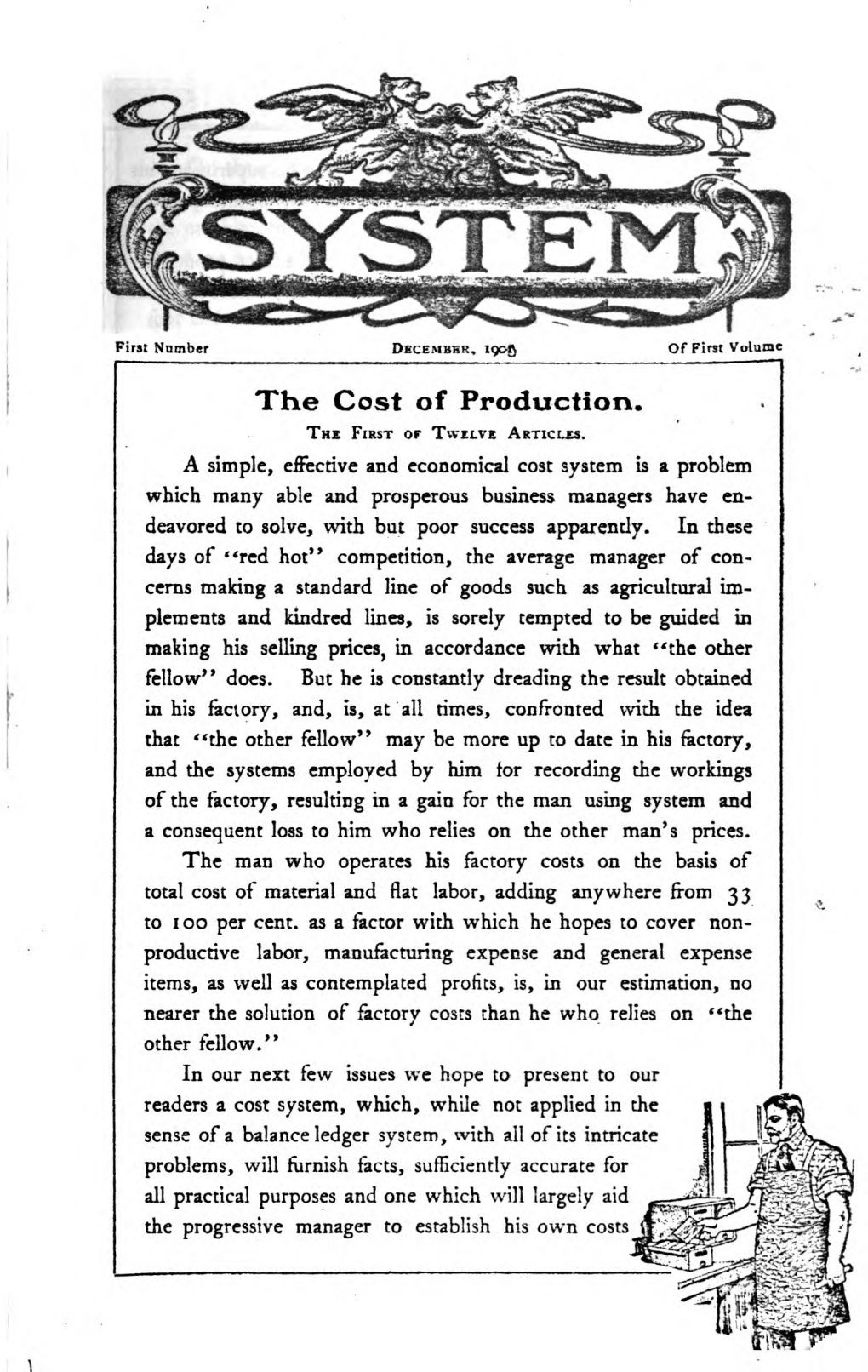
System, first issue, December 1900

The journal System was first published in December 1900 by the Shaw-Walker Company. Since the second volume in December 1901 it went with the subtitle "The magazine of business." In the very first article, entitled The Cost of Production. one of the initial aims of the magazine was described as:

In our next few issues we hope to present to our readers a cost system, which, while not applied in the sense of a balance ledger system, with all of its intricate problems, will furnish facts, sufficiently accurate for all practical purposes and one which will largely aid the progressive manager to establish his own costs in a satisfactory manner as well as point out to his superintendent any weaknesses existing in the factory, thereby profiting by a speedy remedy of excessive costs, etc.

In 1903 A.W. Shaw Company was founded and the System magazine became their flagship publication and a sensation of its time. Jeffrey L. Cruikshan (1987) recalled:

Under Shaw's direction, System attempted to take a practical approach to business. It was a successful magazine, and it grew steadily in size and influence during Shaw's tenure as editor. (In 1927, System was purchased by McGraw-Hill. and renamed Business Week.). But System, as Shaw saw it. faced a difficult question: how to uncover the principles that must underlie the evolving practice of business. It was a question that Shaw himself had faced in 1906, when he had helped Northwestern University design an undergraduate business curriculum.

A few years later at Harvard Business School, Shaw and Edwin Francis Gay were faced with a similar challenge when they were designing the curriculum for the business graduate studies.
