= Richard A. Feiss =

American lawyer and businessman (1878–1954)

Richard Albert Feiss
- Born: July 2, 1878; Cleveland, Ohio, U.S.
- Died: June 4, 1954 (aged 75); Los Angeles, California, U.S.
- Education: Harvard University (AB, LLB)
- Occupation: Business executive
- Employer(s): Joseph & Feiss Co.
- Notable credit(s): President Taylor Society, 1922–1924

Richard Albert Feiss (July 2, 1878 – June 4, 1954) was an American lawyer and business executive. He was the 6th president of the Taylor Society from 1922 to 1924.

== Biography ==
=== Youth, education and early career ===
Feiss was born on July 2, 1878, in Cleveland, to Julius Feiss (1848–1931). He studied law at Harvard University, where he obtained his A.B. in 1901 and his L.L.B. in 1903.

After his graduation Feiss had practiced law in New York for a year. In 1904, he returned to Cleveland to join the garment manufacturing company of his father, producer of men and boy's clothing. The company had just opened a new factory, which was "actively working to eliminate the evils of the "outside" shop system."

=== Further career ===
In 1907, the company adopted the new name and trademark, Joseph & Feiss. Feiss adopted the new scientific management principles, and "set out to manage the company’s work force in a manner that would maximize productivity but at the same time create a humane work environment that would keep workers healthy and happy."

Feiss joined "together Taylor’s principles of scientific management with Progressive era welfare capitalism, establishing a work environment at Joseph & Feiss that many at the time viewed as the most progressive in America."

From 1922 to 1924, Feiss served as president of the Taylor Society as successor of Henry P. Kendall, and succeeded by Percy S. Brown in 1924.

== Selected publications ==
Articles, a selection

- Feiss, Richard A. "Scientific Management Applied To the Steadying of Employment, and Its Effect in an Industrial Establishment." The Annals of the American Academy of Political and Social Science 61.1 (1915): 103–111.
- Feiss, Richard A. "Personal relationship as a basis of scientific management." The Annals of the American Academy of Political and Social Science 65.1 (1916): 27–56.
- Feiss, Richard A. "Scientific management and its relation to the health of the worker." American Journal of Public Health 7.3 (1917): 262–267.
- Feiss, Richard A. "Stimulating Labor Efficiency in War Times." The Annals of the American Academy of Political and Social Science 78.1 (1918): 106–111.
- Feiss, Richard A. "Scientific Management during Times of Depression." Bulletin of Taylor Society 7 (1922): 126–128.

Patents, a selection

- "Carment and method of sewing sleeve linings into armholes thereof." U.S. Patent No 1,575,562, 1926.
- 'Garment and method of making it." U.S. Patent No 1,578,969, 1926.
- "Vent for full-lined garments and method of making it." U.S. Patent No 1,626,799, 1927.

Works about Feiss

- Wrege, Charles D., and Bernice M. Lattanzio. "The Human Side of Enterprise"—Forty-Five Years Before McGregor, the Work of Richard A. Feiss, Early Explorer in Human Relations." Academy of Management Proceedings. Vol. 1977. No. 1. Academy of Management, 1977.
- Goldberg, David J. "Richard A. Feiss, Mary Barnett Gilson, and Scientific Management at Joseph & Feiss, 1909-1925." A Mental Revolution: Scientific Management since Taylor, Columbus: Ohio State University (1992): 40–57.
- Wrege, Charles D., Regina A. Greenwood, and Sakae Hata. "What we do not know about management history: Some categories of research and methods to uncover management history mysteries." Journal of Management History 5.7 (1999): 414–424.
