= Sanford E. Thompson =

American engineer who was part of the American scientific management movement

Sanford Eleazer Thompson
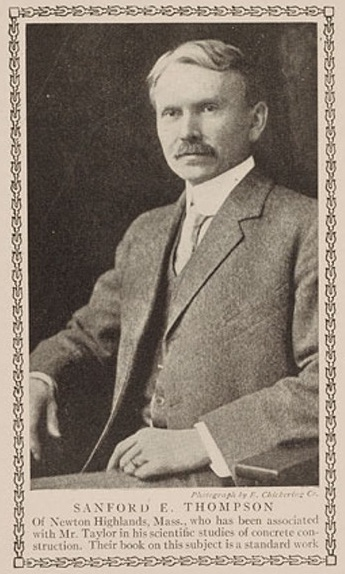
- Sanford E. Thompson in The American Magazine, May 1911
- Born: 1867; United States
- Died: 1949 (aged 81–82)
- Education: Massachusetts Institute of Technology
- Occupations: Civil engineer, consultant
- Known for: Key figure in the American scientific management movement

Sanford Eleazer Thompson (1867–1949) was an American engineer and consultant to the U.S. government and private sector. He is considered one of the key figures of the American scientific management movement, which emerged in the Progressive Era.

== Education and early career ==
Thompson was trained as a civil engineer at the Massachusetts Institute of Technology, graduating in 1889. He was initially employed in construction and hydraulic engineering before becoming an independent consultant from 1896 to 1917.

He entered the United States Army Ordnance Corps as a lieutenant colonel in 1917.

== Work with F.W. Taylor and the time study ==
Thompson was a key ally of Frederick Winslow Taylor and was important in the development of Taylor's time studies, particularly in the building industry.

To accompany Taylor's Harvard College lectures, Thompson delivered an advanced course on time studies.

With Taylor, he co-wrote Concrete Costs (1912), a goal of which was to distil different kinds of manual labor into comparable Unit Times data.

Years later, Lyndall Urwick wrote of Thompson that 'To him belongs the credit for perfecting the "tool" of management, and to him is attributed the invention of the decimal-dial stop-watch.'

== Consultancy career ==
When peace returned, Thompson established another consultancy, Thompson and Lichtner, of which he was president from 1925 through 1949.

He was president of the Taylor Society in 1932.

During World War Two, Thompson acted as a consultant to the U.S. Secretary of War, Henry Lewis Stimson.
