= Harlow S. Person =

American economist

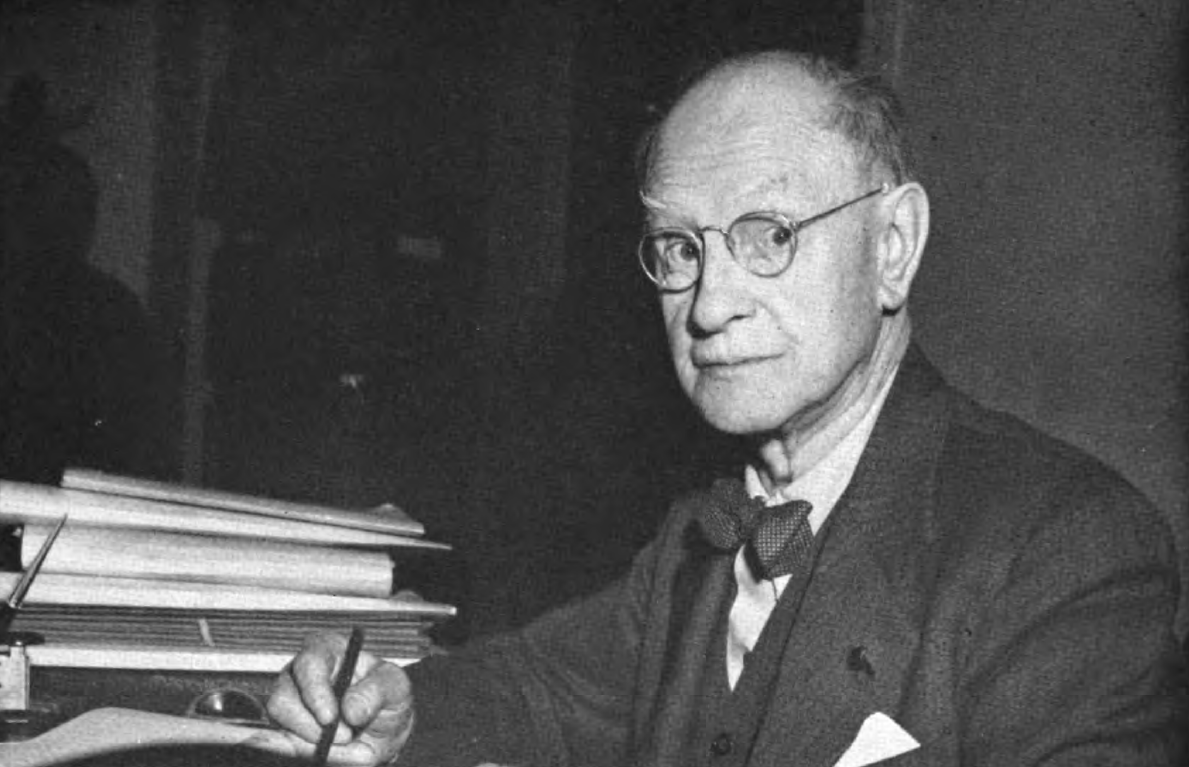
Dr. Harlow S. Person (Image source: "Rural Electrification News," U.S. Department of Agriculture, Rural Electrification Administration, June-July 1953, p. 4)

Harlow Stafford Person (February 16, 1875 – November 7, 1955) was an American economist, Professor of Management and first Dean at the Amos Tuck School of Business, and later secretary and key figure in the Taylor Society.

== Biography ==
=== Youth, education and early career ===
Person was born in Republican City, Nebraska in 1875, son of Rollin Harlow Person and Ida (Madden) Person. After attending the public schools in Howell, Michigan, he studied economics at the University of Michigan. He obtained his PhB in 1899, his MA in 1900, and his PhD in 1902. His PhD thesis was on scientific management.

After his graduating from Michigan in 1902, Person joined the Amos Tuck School of Business faculty at Dartmouth College, where he served until 1917. He became the school's first Professor of Management, and its first real dean.

=== Taylor Society ===
From 1913 to 1918 Person served as 2nd president of the Taylor Society as successor of James Mapes Dodge, who had served from its initiation in 1911. Person was succeeded by John E. Otterson, who served in the year 1918-19.

From 1919, Person was secretary of the Taylor Society, which by the end of the 1920s was one of the most progressive business organisations of the period. It promoted cooperation with organized labor.

While a long-standing supporter of F.W. Taylor, Person objected to Taylor's antagonistic approach to workers and labor unions.

=== "Sales engineering" advocacy ===
In 1922, Person, elaborating on Taylor's own observations on the topic, began lecturing business audiences about the desirability of extending Taylor's managerial principles into what Person called "sales engineering," or what would later come to be called marketing. In such talks, Person predicted that the normal conditions of the big business economy would spur corporations to pursue such a move, by granting competitive advantage to firms that stayed ahead of competitors in developing "sales engineering" techniques.

== Publications ==
- Person, Harlow S. Industrial education; a system of training for men entering upon trade and commerce, Boston and New York, Houghton, Mifflin and company, 1907.
- Harlow S. Person (ed.), Scientific Management in American Industry, Harper & Brothers, 1929.
- Harlow Stafford Person (1942). Mexican Oil: Symbol of Recent Trends in International Relations. Harper & Brothers.

Selected articles

- Harlow S. Person, "What is the Taylor Society?," in: Bulletin of the Taylor Society, December 1922.
- Person, H. S. (1913). "The Amos Tuck School of Dartmouth College". Journal of Political Economy. 21 (2): 117–26. doi:10.1086/252165. JSTOR 1819958.
- "Harlow S. Person". JSTOR.
- Harlow S. Person, "Shaping Your Management to Meet Developing Industrial Conditions," in: Bulletin of the Taylor Society, December 1922.
