= William Henry Leffingwell =

American theorist (1876–1934)

William Henry Leffingwell (June 4, 1876 – December 19, 1934) was an American organizational theorist, president of W. H. Leffingwell, Inc., New Jersey, management author, and the founder of National Office Management Association.

Leffingwell was born in Oxford County, Ontario, to Wendell Phillips and Mary Catherine (Edwards) Leffingwell, both Americans. He was trained as a stenographer and "applied scientific management to the office." Throughout the 1920s, Leffingwell was a key figure in the Taylor Society.

Along with F.W. Taylor, Lyndall Urwick, and others, Leffingwell was subjected to attack by Harry Braverman in Labor and Monopoly Capital: The Degradation of Work in the Twentieth Century (1974).

== Books ==
- William Henry Leffingwell, Making the office pay; tested office plans, methods, and systems that make for better results from everyday routine, A. W. Shaw Company, 1918.
- William Henry Leffingwell, The automatic letterwriter and dictation system, A. W. Shaw Company, 1919.
- William Henry Leffingwell, Office Management - Principles and Practice, London: A. W. Shaw Company, 1925.
- William Henry Leffingwell, The Office Appliance Manual, National Association of Office Appliance Manufacturers, 1926.
- William Henry Leffingwell, A Textbook of Office Management. New York: McGraw-Hill Book Company Inc, 1932.
- William Henry Leffingwell and Edwin Marshall Robinson, Textbook of Office Management, New York: McGraw-Hill, 1943.
