= Robert F. Hoxie =

American economist

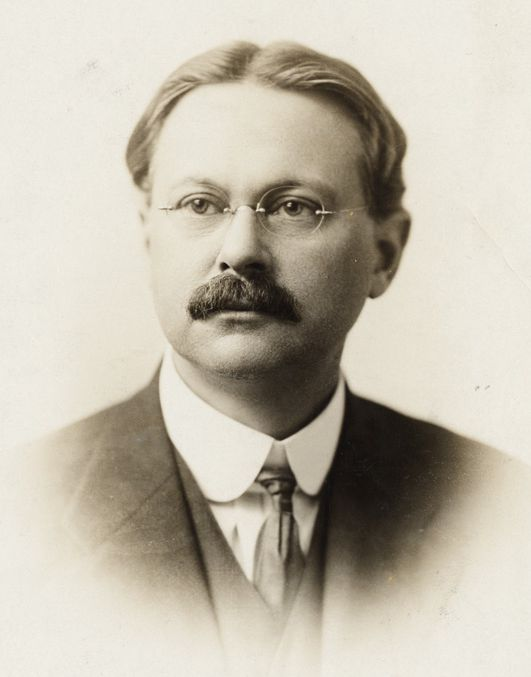
Robert F. Hoxie

Robert Franklin Hoxie (April 29, 1868 – June 22, 1916) was an American economist, known for his work on labor history and industrial relations.

== Personal ==
Hoxie was born in Edmeston, New York to Solomon and Lucy Hoxie. He married Lucy Bennett in 1898 and they had no children. Suffering from ill-health most of his life, it is believed that in a mood of deep depression he ended his own life at the age of 48.

== Career ==
He obtained his undergraduate degree from Cornell University in 1893 and a PhD in economics at the University of Chicago in 1905. After graduation, he lectured at the University of Chicago until his early death in 1916. In the year 1914–1915 he served as special investigator for the U.S. Commission on Industrial Relations.

== Major Contributions ==
His book Scientific Management and Labor (1915) is considered one of the first attempts to examine the relationship between scientific management and trade unions. This work examines the claims of scientific management relative to labor and the issues raised by trade unions related to scientific management. Hoxie concluded that there are legitimate claims regarding the role of scientific management in reducing waste and improving business efficiency, but little evidence of it inherently providing greater protection or democracy for workers and thus the continued need for trade unions to counter management power. Hoxie's study has been criticized as having a pro-labor bias and having led to multiple misunderstandings and misconceptions with regard to scientific management practice versus theory. However, Hoxie is recognized as a dedicated empirical researcher that went beyond mere description to clearly state problems, gather data, and apply rigorous analysis to test theory by reference to facts. A posthumous book, Trade Unionism in the United States (1919) provides an edited collection of his lectures at the University of Chicago.

== Selected publications ==
- Hoxie, Robert Franklin. The demand and supply concepts. The University of Chicago press, 1906.
- Hoxie, Robert Franklin. Scientific management and labor. D. Appleton and Company (New York), 1915; 1921.
- Hoxie, Robert Franklin. Scientific management and social welfare. Survey Books (New York), 1916.
- Hoxie, Robert Franklin and Nathan Fine. Trade unionism in the United States. D. Appleton and Company (New York), 1919; 1921.
