= Horace K. Hathaway =

American consulting engineer and lecturer

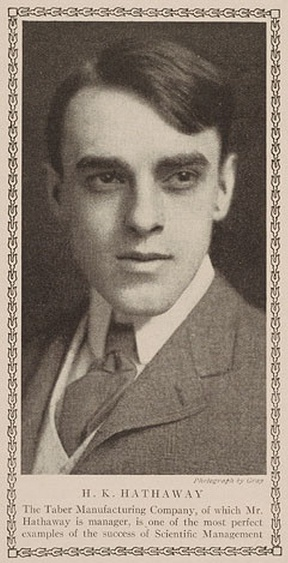
H.K. Hathaway, 1911

Horace King Hathaway (9 April 1878 - 12 June 1944) was an American consulting engineer and lecturer at Harvard Business School, MIT and the Wharton School, known as one of the foremen of scientific management.

== Biography ==
=== Youth, education and early career ===
Born in San Francisco in 1878, Hathaway attended the Drexel Institute of Art, Science, and Industry in Philadelphia and afterwards was apprentice and foreman with the Midvale Steel Company from 1894 to 1896.

In 1902 Hathaway was appointed superintendent at the Payne Engine Company in Elmira, New York. In 1904 he moved to the Link-Belt Company in Philadelphia for a year as assistant to Frederick Winslow Taylor and Carl Barth. From 1905 to 1910 he assisted Barth at the Tabor Manufacturing Company in Philadelphia, where he eventually served as vice president.

=== Later career ===
From 1907 to 1923 Hathaway was consulting engineer at Taylor's consulting firm in Philadelphia, and in between served in the US Army in World War I. From 1923 to 1927 he was consulting engineer back at the West Coast, from 1927 to 1941 director at a chemical company in St. Louis, and from 1941 to his death in 1944 again consulting engineer in the West.

Over the years Hathaway had lectured at Harvard Business School, MIT and the Wharton School, and in his last year the lectured at Stanford University.

== Selected reading ==
- Hathaway, H. K., "The Planning Department, Its Organization and Function." in: Industrial Engineering, 1912, 12.
- Hathaway, H. K., "Elementary Study as a Part of the Taylor System of Scientific Management." Industrial Engineer: 85-95.
- Hathaway, H. K., "On the technique of manufacturing." The Annals of the American Academy of Political and Social Science 85.1 (1919): 231-256.
- Hathaway, H. K., "Logical Steps in Installing the Taylor System of Management," Industrial Magazine, Vol. LX, No. 2, August, 1920, p. 93.
- Hathaway, H. K., "The Mnemonic System of Classification," Industrial Management, Vol. LX, No. 3, September, 1920, pp. 173–183.
- Hathaway, H. K., "Premium and bonus plans." Bulletin of the Taylor Society 8.2 (1923): 59-65.
- Hathaway, H. K., "Standards," Bulletin of the Taylor Society, Vol. XII, No. 5, October, 1927, p. 491; Republished as "Factory Operations Standards." in: Harlow S. Person (ed.), Scientific Management in American Industry, Harper & Brothers, 1929. p. 196-226
