= John E. Otterson =

John Edward Otterson (March 29, 1881 – August 10, 1964) was an American engineer and business executive at Winchester Repeating Arms Company in the 1920s, Western Electric Company in the 1920-30s, and at Paramount Productions, Inc. in 1935-36. He is also known as 3rd president of the Taylor Society in the year 1918-19.

== Biography ==
=== Youth, education and early career ===
Otterson was born in 1881 in Allegheny, Pennsylvania, son of John Price Otterson and Louise (LeGrand) Otterson. After high school, in 1900, he joined the U.S. Navy. In serves he graduated from the United States Naval Academy in 1904 and obtained his MSc from the Massachusetts Institute of Technology in 1909. He resigned from the U.S. Navy in 1915 as naval constructor, with the rank of lieutenant.

In 1915 Otterson joined the Winchester Repeating Arms Company, where he worked his way up from general manufacturing superintendent to vice-president, president and director in 1922. In World War I he also served at the United States Council of National Defense as a member of the Munitions Standards Board. From 1922 to 1924 He was also president and director of the Simmons Hardware Company, and he established a merger between the two companies.

In 1918-19 Otterson also served as president of the Taylor Society as successor of Harlow S. Person, and was succeeded by Henry S. Dennison.

=== Further career ===
In 1924 Otterson moved from firearms into telecommunications, and started as assistant general superintendent of International Western Electric Company, the overseas operations of Western Electric Co Inc. Next, he moved up at Western Electric Company from general commercial engineer to general commercial manager in 1926. In 1927 he became general manager, vice-president and director of Electrical Research Products, Inc., where he was president from 1928 until June 1935. In these period he directed the international activities of Western Electric Company in Middle and South America, and parts of Europe and the Middle East.

In June 1935 Otterson became president and director of Paramount Productions, Inc. and Paramount Pictures Dist. Co., Inc., where he resigned one year later, June, 1936. The New York Times (1964) summarized, that Otterson "replaced Adolph Zukor, who became chairman of the board. In 1936, Mr. Otterson was forced out of the Paramount company under a stipulation that he was to get $200,000 for his Paramount contract."

From the motion picture industry Otterson moved into the shipbuilding enterprise. He first joined the American Arbitration Association in New York, New haven. In July 1941 he was appointed director of the U.S. Office of Ship Repair, coordinating ship repair and conversion for the Navy and the United States Maritime Commission. From middle 1942 to early 1943 he was president of the New Jersey Shipbuilding Corporation, built landing craft and tankers, and chaired of the American Maritime Council. After World War II he served as president of the East Coast Shipyards, Inc., and was on the board of the Anigraphic Process, Inc., and the Naumo Corporation.

=== Family life ===
Otterson married Roxanna Johnson in 1904, and they had one son John E. Otterson Jr., in 1964 a resident of Chicago.

Otterson had survived his wife by 11 years, and had lived in Ridgefield, Connecticut. He died in 1964 at the Norwalk Hospital in Norwalk, Connecticut at the age of 83.
