= Raymond R. Zimmerman =

American civil servant (1893-1986)

Raymond Zimmerman

Administrative Assistant to the President
- In office September 1945 – March 1947 (resigned)
- President: Harry Truman
- Preceded by: George J. Schoeneman
- Succeeded by: Donald S. Dawson

Personal details
- Born: Raymond Rudolph Zimmerman; November 7, 1893 Dighton, Kansas
- Died: January 1, 1986 (aged 92)
- Spouse: Gladys Hall
- Children: 1
- Education: Greenville College
- Occupation: engineer; personnel manager; civil servant

Raymond Rudolph Zimmerman (November 7, 1893 – January 1986) was an American engineer, personnel manager, and civil servant. He is best known as the 6th president of the Society for Advancement of Management between the years 1944-1946, and as Administrative Assistant to President Truman between 1945-1947.

== Early life ==
Zimmerman was born 1893 in Dighton, Kansas, son of Reverent Otto С. Zimmerman and Katherine (Buehler) Zimmerman. He earned his bachelor of arts from Greenville College in 1917.

== Career ==
=== Army and early career ===
After Zimmerman's graduation in 1917, when the United States entered World War I, Zimmerman joined the US Army and became first Lieutenant at the Infantry R.C. Texas, From 1919 to 1921 he served overseas as first Lieutenant as assistant superintendent and director of ports in Great Britain, and at the United States Shipping Board.

From 1922 to 1934, Zimmerman was an employment and personnel manager at the Continental Oil Company, now Conoco, Ponca City, Oklahoma. In 1924, he took some courses at the Oklahoma Agricultural and Mechanical College at the Oklahoma State University–Stillwater. In 1925 he had become personnel director, and when Marland merged with the Continental Oil Company, he became personnel director for the entire firm. By 1932, he had switched to the Industrial Relations Department of the Continental Oil Company, as where in 1933 he was industrial relations chief of the Continental Oil Co.

=== Later career and honors ===
After Zimmerman left Continental Oil Company, by 1937, he was director of personnel of the Federal Home Loan Bank Board, which includes the Home Owners' Loan Corporation. By 1940, Zimmerman had joined the staff of the United States Civil Service Commission, where in 1943 he served as executive assistant to the Chairman of the Council of Personnel Administration.

From September 1945 until early 1947, Zimmerman was Administrative Assistant to President Harry Truman, as successor of George J. Schoeneman. He resigned March 1947 on personal matters. He was succeeded five months later by Donald S. Dawson.

Some of the documentation of his federal work have ended up in the President Truman Library. Other later papers and his memoirs, until 1976, have ended up in the Niles Family Papers (1881-1991) at the Historical Library of Swarthmore College. Mary Cushing Niles had served in the United States Civil Service Commission from 1941-1957 as Assistant the Chairman of the Federal Personnel Council. Zimmerman had continued to cooperate with Niles, and others.

From 1944 to 1946, Zimmerman had served as national president of the Society for Advancement of Management (SAM) as successor of Percy S. Brown, and was succeeded by Harold B. Maynard. In 1978 the Greenville College awarded him the Greenville College Distinguished Alumnus award.

== Personal life ==
Zimmerman married Gladys Hall on February 29, 1926. They had one daughter. Zimmerman passed away in January 1986.

== Selected publications ==
- Zimmerman, R. R., "In-Service Training for the Personnel Job," Personnel Series, AMA, Nr 36-50. 1939. p. 23-
- Raymond R. Zimmerman, "More Teamwork in Management," Personnel Administration 8 (June 1946): 28.
- R.R. Zimmerman. "The Insiders' Role in the Outside Look," in: Institute in Personnel Administration, Volumes 11-13, New York State Civil Service Department, Training Division, 1948. p. 7
- R.R. Zimmerman'"Are Federal Employees Expendable Too." in: Personnel Administration, Volume 6. Society for Personnel Administration, 1964. p. 1-5
