= James Mapes Dodge =

American mechanical engineer, inventor and industrialist

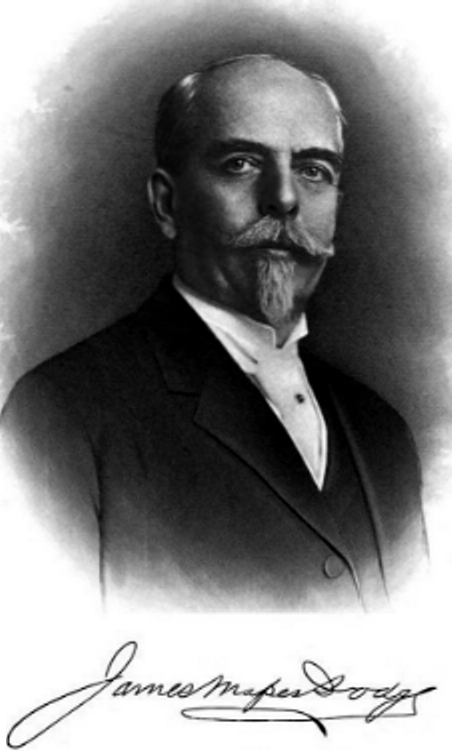
James Mapes Dodge (1852–1915)

James Mapes Dodge (Manhattan, June 30, 1852 – Germantown, Philadelphia, December 4, 1915) was an American mechanical engineer, inventor, industrialist and president of the American Society of Mechanical Engineers in the year 1903–1904. He is known as president of the Link-Belt Company, and as pioneer of applying scientific management methods.

== Life and work ==
Dodge was the son of William Dodge, member of the New York bar, and Mary Mapes Dodge, a children's writer and editor of the St. Nicholas magazine. He grew up in Manhattan, attended the Newark Academy, and obtained degrees from Cornell University, and Rutgers University

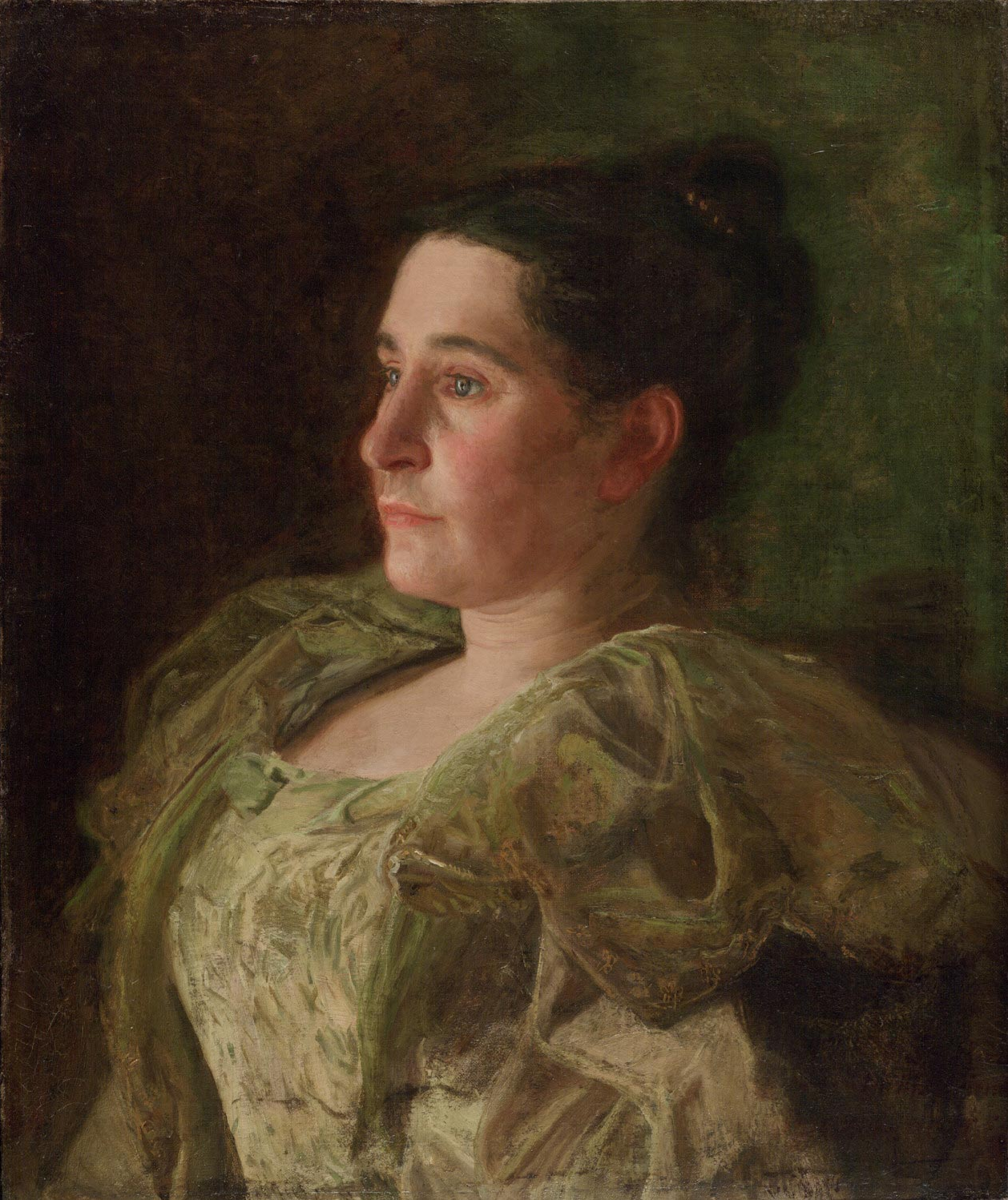
Thomas Eakins, Portrait of Mrs. James Mapes Dodge (1896, oil on canvas), Philadelphia Museum of Art

After an apprenticeship at the shipbuilding company John Roach & Sons, in 1876, he started a mining machine manufacturing company with E.T. Copeland in New York. When this didn't work out and the company dissolved, he worked another six years in manufacturing companies in Chicago and Indianapolis. In 1884 he founded Burr & Dodge in Philadelphia, that in 1906 merged with the Link-Belt Engineering company into the Link-Belt Company with Dodge as president, later de Link-Belt Construction Equipment company.

In his lifetime Dodge was a productive inventor, and was granted over 200 patents concerning link-belts, moving stair, toys, etc. In 1903–04 Dodge was president of the American Society of Mechanical Engineers. In 1906 he and Henry R. Towne were responsible for maneuvering Frederick Winslow Taylor to the Presidency of the ASME in 1906.

The Philadelphia plant of the Link-Belt Company is known for its significant labor efficiency improvements, due to the introduction of scientific management applications. According to Leon P. Alford especially Dodge's personal involvement and personality made this happen. He had offered the workers special arrangements and incentives to accept Taylor's changes, which won him much respect and trust from the workers..

== Publications ==
- James Mapes Dodge, "The money value of technical training," in: Transactions of the American Society of Mechanical Engineers, 25 (1903): 40–48
- James Mapes Dodge, G. Schlesinger, Industrielle Betriebsführung, 1913
- James M. Dodge, President Link-Belt Engineering Co., "History of the Link-Belt Industry," Industrial World: Devoted to the Metal. Electrical. Mining & Allied Industries 78 (26, June 28, 1906):753.

Patents, a selection

- US D6203 S, Design for a toy-boat, 1872
- US 37499 Drive chain, 1880-81
- US 239739 Hinge Joint &c., 1881
- US 954941 Sprocket-wheel, 1909-1910

Publications about James Mapes Dodge

- Charles Piez, Personal reminiscences of James Mapes Dodge, 1916
- George P. Torrence. James Mapes Dodge: Mechanical Engineer, Inventor, Pioneer in Industry. 2010
