= Morris Llewellyn Cooke =

American engineer

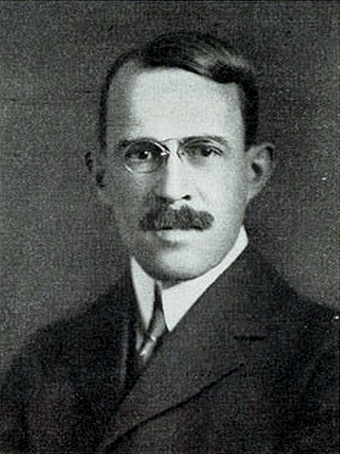
- Morris Llewellyn Cooke, 1911
- Born: May 11, 1872; Carlisle, Pennsylvania, U.S.
- Died: March 5, 1960 (aged 87)
- Education: Lehigh University
- Occupation: Engineer
- Known for: Rural Electrification
- Scientific career
- Fields: Electrical engineering, scientific management

Morris Llewellyn Cooke (May 11, 1872 – March 5, 1960) was an American engineer, best known for his work on Scientific Management and Rural Electrification.

== Biography ==
Born in Carlisle, Pennsylvania as one of eight children of William Harvey Cooke and Elizabeth Richmond Marsden, Cooke attended Lehigh University and obtained his degree in mechanical engineering in 1895. He then joined the work force as a machinist. In 1900 he married Eleanor Bushnell Davis, a granddaughter of the industrialist Daniel Bushnell.

Cooke directed the Rural Electrification Administration from May 1935 through March 1937. In March 1937, Cooke resigned and was succeeded by John M. Carmody. In 1940 Cooke became a technical consultant for the Office of Production Management, where he led an American technical mission to Brazil. In 1943 he headed the War Labor Board panel to mediate a coal miners' strike. In 1946-1947 he was a member of a committee to survey the patent system. In 1950 President Harry S. Truman appointed Cooke chairman of the Water Resources Policy Commission

Cooke was recognized for his work on obtaining inexpensive electricity for residential use, facilitating better labor-management relations, and the conservation of land and water resources. As he wrote in 1913, "We shall never fully realize . . . the dreams of democracy until the principles of scientific management have permeated every nook and cranny of the working world."

== Work ==
=== Scientific management ===
In 1903 Cooke met Frederick W. Taylor, a mechanical engineer, who strongly influenced him. Taylor chose four men, one of whom was Cooke, to implement his theories of scientific management in the work force. At this time, Cooke and Taylor developed a professional relationship. Taylor's principles influenced Cooke to believe that "the application of scientific management principles to industry would benefit all of society."

This belief led to the creation of Cooke's own scientific consultancy firm in 1905.

In 1907, Cooke wrote a book, Industrial Management, which was never published but arguably influenced F.W. Taylor's Principles of Scientific Management (1911). It was based on Taylor's lectures which Cooke had attended.

In 1908-09, Cooke consulted at Williams & Wilkins in Baltimore. Friction with another scientific management protégé of Taylor's, Henry Gantt (whose family home was in Baltimore), led to Cooke's interventions being largely inconsequential.

In 1911, Cooke was appointed director of the Department of Public Works by Philadelphia's reform mayor, Rudolph Blankenburg. It was here that Cooke began to implement Taylor's principles of Scientific Management in order to change what he considered inefficient management practices in several departments. This change saved taxpayers thousands of dollars. This work was later reflected during World War II when he served on several boards. While serving on these boards Cooke was able to improve the storage of military goods. He also reorganized the Quartermaster Corps, and provided more electrical service to shipyards.

Between 1923 and 1925, Cooke administered a survey under Pennsylvania governor Gifford Pinchot. This survey "emphasized public support for rural electrification and state-directed reorganization of the electric industry."

=== Rural electrification ===
Morris Cooke had been interested in, and began working toward, the idea of rural electrification beginning in the 1920s. Cooke had been a progressive Republican prior to 1930, but following the election of Franklin D. Roosevelt, Cooke shifted his support and became a liberal Democrat. Morris Cooke was selected for several committees by President Roosevelt; these included:

- the Upstream Engineering Conference,
- the Great Plains Drought Area Committee, and
- the Mississippi Valley Committee.

However, Cooke was most influential in his appointment as the director of the Rural Electrification Administration. This agency had been newly organized by the Roosevelt administration and was set up to finance the construction of power distribution systems in rural areas lacking electricity.

== Selected publications ==
- Academic and Industrial Efficiency (1910)
- Scientific Management of the Public Business(1915)
- Our Cities Awake (1918)
- Brazil on the March (1944)
- Organized Labor and Production (1940)
- Giant Power: Large Scale Electrical Development as a Social Factor (1925)
- Modern Manufacturing: A Partnership of Idealism and Common Sense (1919)
