= Deskilling =

Lowering of skill levels by new technology

In economics, deskilling is the process by which skilled labor within an industry or economy is eliminated by the introduction of technologies operated by semi-skilled or unskilled workers. This results in cost savings due to lower investment in human capital, and reduces barriers to entry, weakening the bargaining power of the human capital. Deskilling is the decline in working positions through the machinery or technology introduced to separate workers from the production process.

Deskilling can also refer to individual workers specifically. The term refers to a person becoming less proficient over time. Examples of how this can occur include changes in one's job definition, moving to a completely different field, chronic underemployment (e.g. working as a cashier instead of an accountant), and being out of the workforce for extended periods of time (e.g. quitting a position in order to focus exclusively on child-rearing). It can also apply to immigrants who held high-skilled jobs in their countries of origin but cannot find equivalent work in their new countries and so are left to perform low-skilled work they are overqualified for. This can often be the result of problems in getting foreign-issued professional qualifications and degrees recognized, or discriminatory hiring practices that favor native-born workers. In addition, relying on technological decision aids and automation has been found to contribute to individual workers' deskilling: in the presence of reliable technological aids, workers (e.g., accountants, doctors, pilots) tend to decrease their cognitive engagement with the work task.

It has been criticized for decreasing quality, demeaning labor (rendering work mechanical, rather than thoughtful and making workers automatons rather than artisans), undermining community, or entrenching harmful but less intensive practices.

== History and arguments of classical economic theory ==
Deskilling as a byproduct of technological advancements, generally driven by production innovation, can first be examined during the Industrial Revolution in late 18th-century England. On the other hand, skilling is also seen as a direct consequence of technological advancement, whereby workers have the opportunity to adopt new operational knowledge through upskilling.

The stance on deskilling within technological advancement and its impact on the division of labour is politically polarizing. Adam Smith and prominent socialist advocates such as Karl Marx regarded technological development as having a deskilling-bias, with advancements in economies of scale and reduction in required workers as by laws of diminishing returns rapidly increasing investor profit. This liberal view theorizes that deskilling's resultant simplification of worker tasks or replacement of previously skilled workers reduced opportunities, bargaining power and was utilized as a weapon by the bourgeoisie to enforce a classist struggle that shrinks the middle class.

Alternatively, pro-capitalist ideology supported by Charles Babbage argues that technological change embodied by inducement mechanisms support the skill-enhancing opportunities of workers, rather than simplifying workers roles. This neoliberal economic view saw deskilling as an unintentional byproduct, rather than an envisaged motivator.

However, the establishment of classical economic theory dictates that technical change directly affects wealth, consumption, employment, and income distribution. Although innovation is essential for growing economies, the structural byproduct of such advancements are argued by classical economic theory to increase, diminish or shift the demand for skilled and unskilled labourers. In this case, classical political economists view that the 18th-century Industrial Revolution was driven for the purpose of deskilling incumbent workers is not empirically supported. Regardless, the byproduct of such technological advancement promoted the skilling of proportionately fewer workers. Economic historians support that there is no clear deskilling tendency within 18th and 19th century economies but rather a combination of deskilling, skilling and skill-displacement.

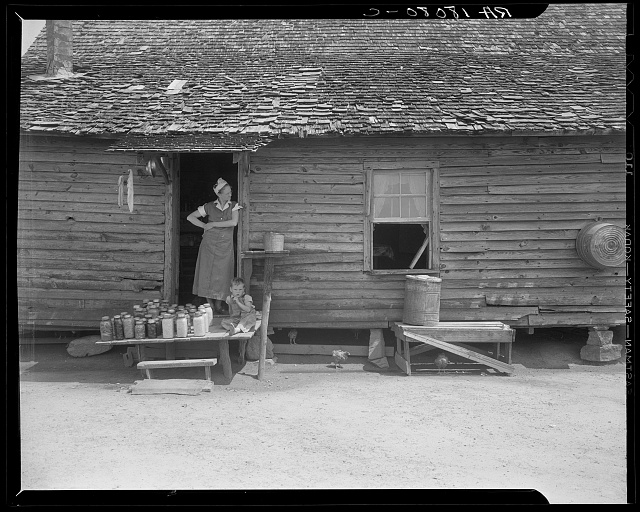
Utilization of 19th century children in the labour force.

19th century statistics support the growth of skilled workers, including high-skilled and low-skilled workers, as reaching above 60% of the English and Welsh population. However, this statistic fails to mention the growth in highly skilled or low-skilled workers, thus providing no evidence to support the claim that deskilling was the prominent outcome.

There was considerable growth in the share of unskilled workers from 20% in 1700 to 39% in 1850. This was a direct result of manufacturing innovations requiring less-skilled workers to operate certain machinery, however, neither confirms nor denies the deskilling of existing workers, although disproportionately fewer skilled workers upskilled during the industrial revolution. Furthermore, the Industrial Revolution incurred unprecedented economic growth, thus requiring more employees from previously unemployed demographics such as women and children who were largely unskilled.

Documented outcomes of innovation also support the increase in apprenticeships and literacy throughout the industrial revolution, growing the middle class, however, proportionately less than the upper-class, once again supporting the ambiguity of deskilling-bias in a historic context.

== 1970s ==
The same arguments for and against deskilling-bias in technical change were made in the 20th century, particularly during Gerald Ford's US presidency from 1974 to 1977. Rather than industrial reform causing worker displacement, the exponential growth of the neoliberal economy and various innovations of technological advancements presented a contemporary form of skill-displacement.

Harry Braverman's 1974 book Labor and Monopoly Capital popularized the idea that the degradation of work inflicted by technological development created a new middle class that was reskilled, but not necessarily better equipped. The 1974-75 period presented the first economic crisis in the U.S. since the great depression, after experiencing massive economic growth since World War II. In experiencing this crisis, Braverman reasserted the importance of the Marxist law of accumulation on class polarization under conditions of monopoly capitalism, warning that neoliberal economies could experience a shrinking of the middle class.

On the contrary, Andre Gorz argued in his 1982 book Farewell to the Working Class, that the working class had been replaced by an unskilled non-class of non-workers as a result of technological change promoting deskilling, unemployment, and dissociation of labourers from the process. Gorz's argument was disputed by Braverman, who claimed that although these trends existed it was a result of technological change's dynamic process that decomposed and recomposed the working class. This view assumes that the unemployment being experienced was mostly structural and the working conditions were integral in the long-term evolution of the working class, in line with Marx's general law of accumulation.

== 21st century ==
In the 21st century economy much of the world operates within a regulated capitalist framework rather than promoting the neoliberal environment that drove the 20th century. Regardless, as technological growth creates exponential levels of innovation, furthering both economies of scale and scope, modern deskilling presents a relevant issue to the division of labour and class proletarianism.

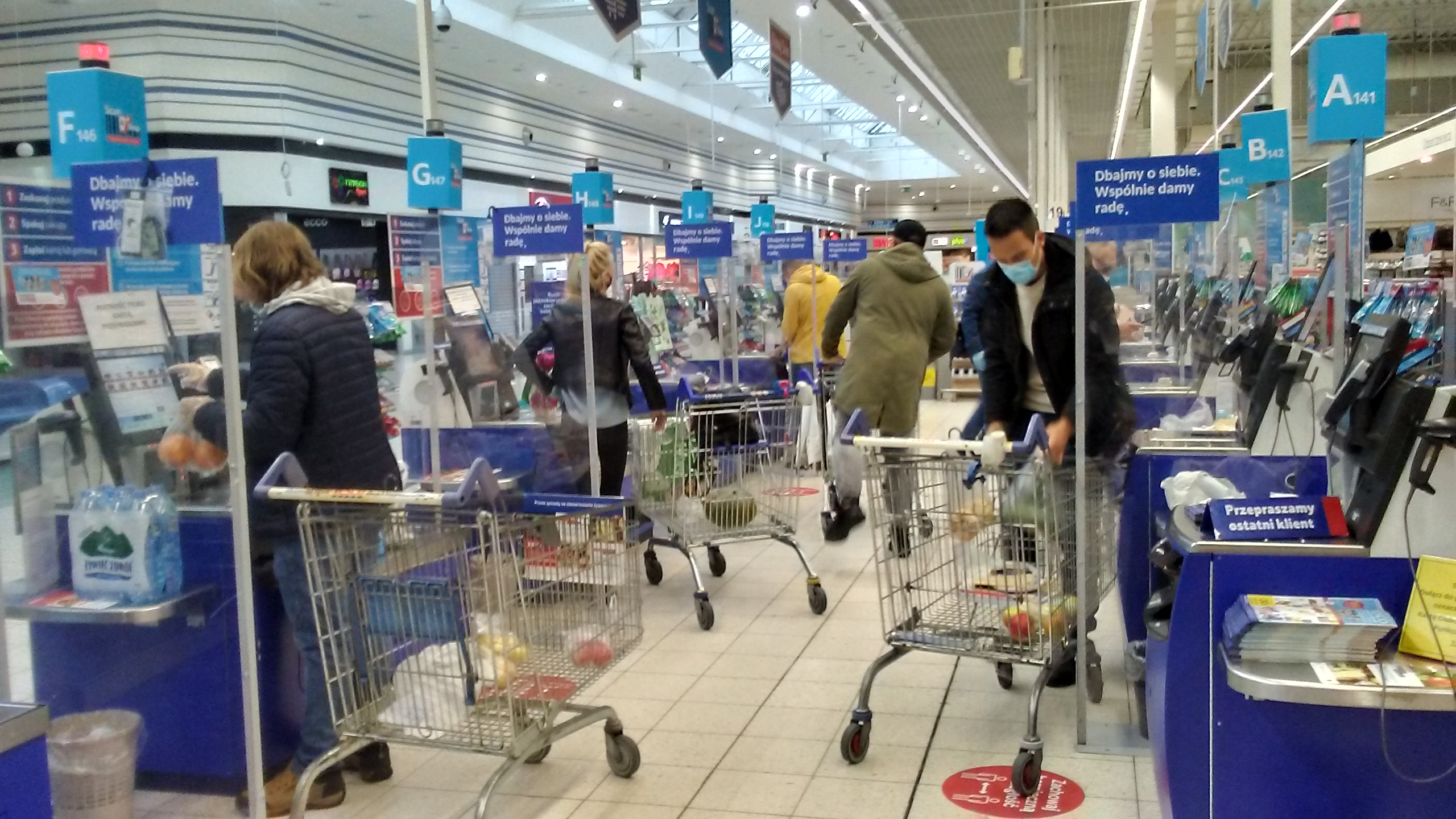
Self-service checkout machines reducing required staff.

Evidently, economic growth of the 21st century has been driven by globalisation and the digital age that has promoted an increase in individual consumer demand and thus encouraged market innovations. These innovations are largely driven by technology, which has produced unprecedented restructuring of the labour force that removes previously skilled workers from the manufacturing and professional process (see examples section). A major difference in modern deskilling is the increased relevance modern innovations have not only on blue-collar labourers, but white-collar professionals, impacting teachers, analysts, lawyers, bankers and pilots, who had previously maintained a relatively steady level of skill share throughout the industrial revolution.

=== Professional ===
Deprofessionalization, whereby professional workers are experiencing deskilling largely due to automation, has become more prevalent within the 21st century. Deprofessionalization occurs as automation substitutes cause professionals to lose previously unique attributes such as experience and knowledge within a specialised field. This has been examined closely within para-lawyers, where database innovations have reduced the requirement of previously necessary qualifications, with deprofessionalisation taking place as "the more that tasks can be compartmentalized and the more that knowledge-based tools can be applied, the easier it is to assign the task to a person with limited, specific expertise." As such, new tasks that are provided reduce the professionals previous work capacity, evidently showing deskilling in white-collar industries.

Technology has also provided complementary innovations that have largely assisted teachers. Although providing useful tools, technological integration has increased various information sources that have reduced teachers ability to provide critical information. This is further exhibited in the USA, where a national curriculum and distribution of knowledge has standardised a common knowledge base across districts and states, thus resulting in the "deskilling of teachers as professionals, and the production of texts that are characterised by superficial and biased treatment of topics, and include irrelevant materials and unchallenging tasks."

Further deskilling as an outcome of restructuring as a result of teaching innovations shows proletarianization focusing on the intensification of teachers' work as they fulfill a wider range of functions, which is seen as entailing the deskilling of teachers as their range of knowledge and skill is reduced and routinized and a loss of control over their work. To counter the deskilling effects of modern teachers, trade unions in Scandinavia established 'codetermination legislation' in the 1950s with continual amendments that aim to prevent deskilling via automation and technologies disruption in restructuring traditional roles.

Other highly regarded professions such as airplane pilots have been directly impacted by automation and the integration of autopilot. This naturally causes deskilling through disengaging pilots from the majority of the flight process, which was previously highly involved. Studies have found that this deskilling effect and the overuse of autopilot creates extreme reliance on the technology and reduces the pilots capabilities when manual control is necessary. Thus, deskilling as well as having quality of work, wage and greater economic impacts also leads to performance degradation, especially within highly qualified professions.

In medicine, a 2025 multicentre observational study in Poland reported that endoscopists' adenoma detection rate during standard colonoscopies decreased from 28% to 22% after routine exposure to an AI-assisted polyp detection system, suggesting a possible deskilling effect.

=== Deskilling and Brexit ===
Along with globalisation fostering growth via technological means, it also promoted the diversification of the labour force through international workers. The European Union, in which the United Kingdom was a major contributor, allowed free movement, therefore increasing the competitive landscape of primarily blue-collar jobs and associated conditions (i.e. wages).

Brexit was a major geopolitical and economic event, whereby the UK left the European Union. Immigration and the freedom of movement was a major factor that won the conservative effort to leave the EU via referendum, as many citizens envisaged this event to increase work opportunities and its standard.

As a result of the departure from the European Union, the domestic UK economy experienced cost shock due to the ambiguity of regional trade deals. Despite the increase in regulations for free movement, the lack of demand across all levels of the UK economy depreciated the pound sterling. Along with wages, trainee offerings also decreased – the opposite effect of what occurred in the 18th-century UK during the Industrial Revolution – and thus the economy experienced deskilling.

This provides that deskilling, despite primarily occurring as a result of technical change, can also occur due to internal and external shocks that have cultivated more severe consequences as a result of globalisation.

It was expected by Brexit lobbyists and voters that this depreciation would increase exports. However, due to trade uncertainties and the fact that the UK had relied on specific foreign sources for their intermediate inputs, deskilling in industries that relied on such inputs was prominent. Economists argue that the long-term impact of this deskilling may have detrimental impacts on the UK's production when free trade agreements eventuate and stunt innovation and growth within the middle class.

== Social impacts ==
=== Artisan impact ===
Work is fragmented, and individuals lose the integrated skills and comprehensive knowledge of the crafts persons.

In an application to the arts, Benjamin Buchloh defines deskilling as "a concept of considerable importance in describing numerous artistic endeavors throughout the twentieth century with relative precision. All of these are linked in their persistent effort to eliminate artisanal competence and other forms of manual virtuosity from the horizon of both artist competence and aesthetic valuation."

=== Class inequality ===
Along with impacting sectors outside of the immediate working class such as cultural arts, deskilling can have various societal impacts due to the restructuring of classes. Work is generally the largest aspect of modern adult life. Deskilling has a major impact on wages, work quality and unemployment, thus the availability of sufficient "social insurance" and job market in general has a substantial impact on the definition of meaningful work.

From a western perspective, this shift in market economies has financially incentivised companies to exploit vulnerable workers who have experienced deskilling in the 21st century. Particularly, the 21st century has created a job market that has increased uncertainty and job insecurity due to both economic crises inflicting cyclical unemployment and technological advancements restructuring the majority of work sectors, thus inflicting structural unemployment. The idea that workers can obtain new skills throughout this process is true, however, technological advancements' priority is to encourage a more cost-efficient supply-chain, therefore, as employment is a substantial cost, these created jobs that may involve skilling are proportionately fewer. Furthermore, in the case of automation replacement, previous employees being removed from the production process generally take on an observer role that requires less human capital. All of these factors create an economy that promotes cheap labour due to the reduced bargaining power of modern workers, naturally increasing the growth of the top 1% and fragmenting the middle class.

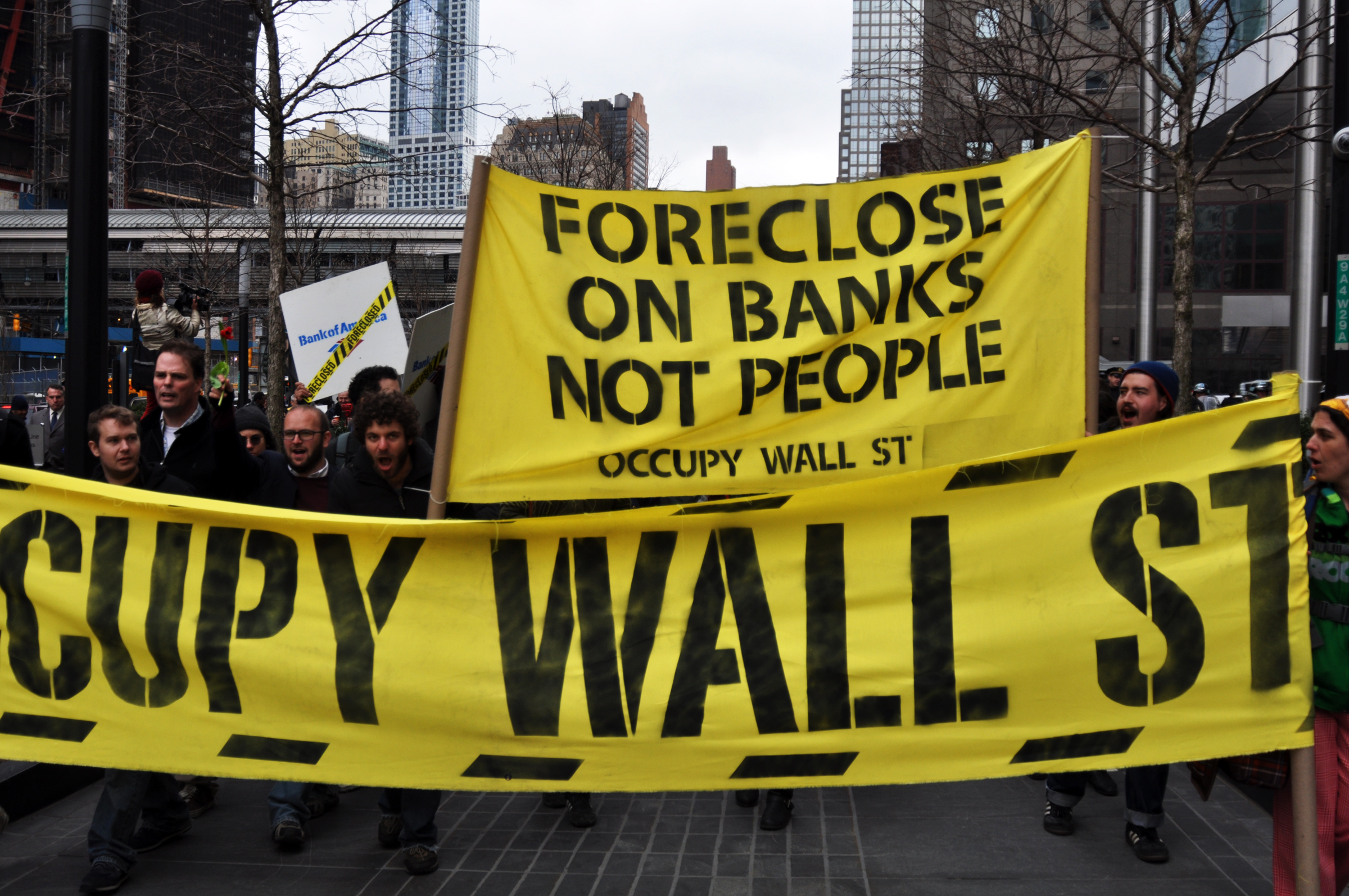
Occupy Wall Street protest in New York City: "Foreclose On Banks Not People".

Generally, these companies that provide poorer conditions don't fear backlash from consumer boycotts. Largely, this can be attributed to many cheap labour tasks being incremental in the supply-chain and or completed within developing economies overseas. Developing, or second-world nations have experienced massive real GDP growth as a result of technological change promoting the ability for cheap labour, coupled with globalisations influence that leverages first-world nations (generally western), with already established economies and trade agreements. Although these economies don't experience the same level of deskilling as western nations and have grown their working class, much like 18th century England, it shows the impact modern technological change has on the restructuring of global markets.

Recent reports by The Economist also support that the resultant job-creation of technological advancements offer plentiful opportunities for low and high-skilled workers, however, middle-skilled workers opportunities are scarcer due to the mismatch in required skills. Middle-skilled workers will likely adopt frictional unemployment as they search for new jobs that they are overqualified for, supporting deskilling's influence within internal firm change and throughout the economy.

Although the long-term social impacts of deskilling are unknown, it is predicted by sociologists, economists and psychologists that the increased wage inequality that deskilling has provided will increase social unrest. Unionization as a means to argue for better working conditions may also become more relevant, with some economists claiming that the overall growth in wages will substitute for income inequality. Once again, the social impacts largely depend on opinions regarding the effectiveness of an unregulated neoliberal economy that experienced success in the 20th century. However, the fragmentation and weakening of the middle class historically induces an eruption of social unrest such as boycotting and establishing extremist views.

== Law enforcement and military ==
Iranian-born scholar Darius Rejali popularized the concept of deskilling in regards to the use of torture by liberal democracies. Despite portraying torture as a measure of last resort, the relative ease of torturing for information leads to a heavy preference among personnel for torture over other, more time- and skill-intensive forms of investigation. A contributor to the Indian Evidence Act, 1872 is quoted as explaining "It is far pleasanter to sit comfortably in the shade rubbing pepper into a poor devil's eyes than to go about in the sun hunting up evidence." The simplicity of torture can subsequently undercut and devalue non-violent forms of information-gathering, in turn necessitating a wider and more intense use of torture to extract comparable information in a highly damaging feedback loop.

== Examples ==
Examples of deprofessionalization can be found across many professions, and include:

- assembly line workers replacing artisans and craftsmen
- CNC machine tools replacing machinists
- automatic espresso machines replacing skilled baristas
- bank-clerks being replaced by ATMs
- shop workers being replaced by self-checkout technology

== See also ==
- Automation
- Craft guild
- Division of Labor
- Proletarianization
- Technological unemployment
- Unionization
