= Scientific management =

Theory of management

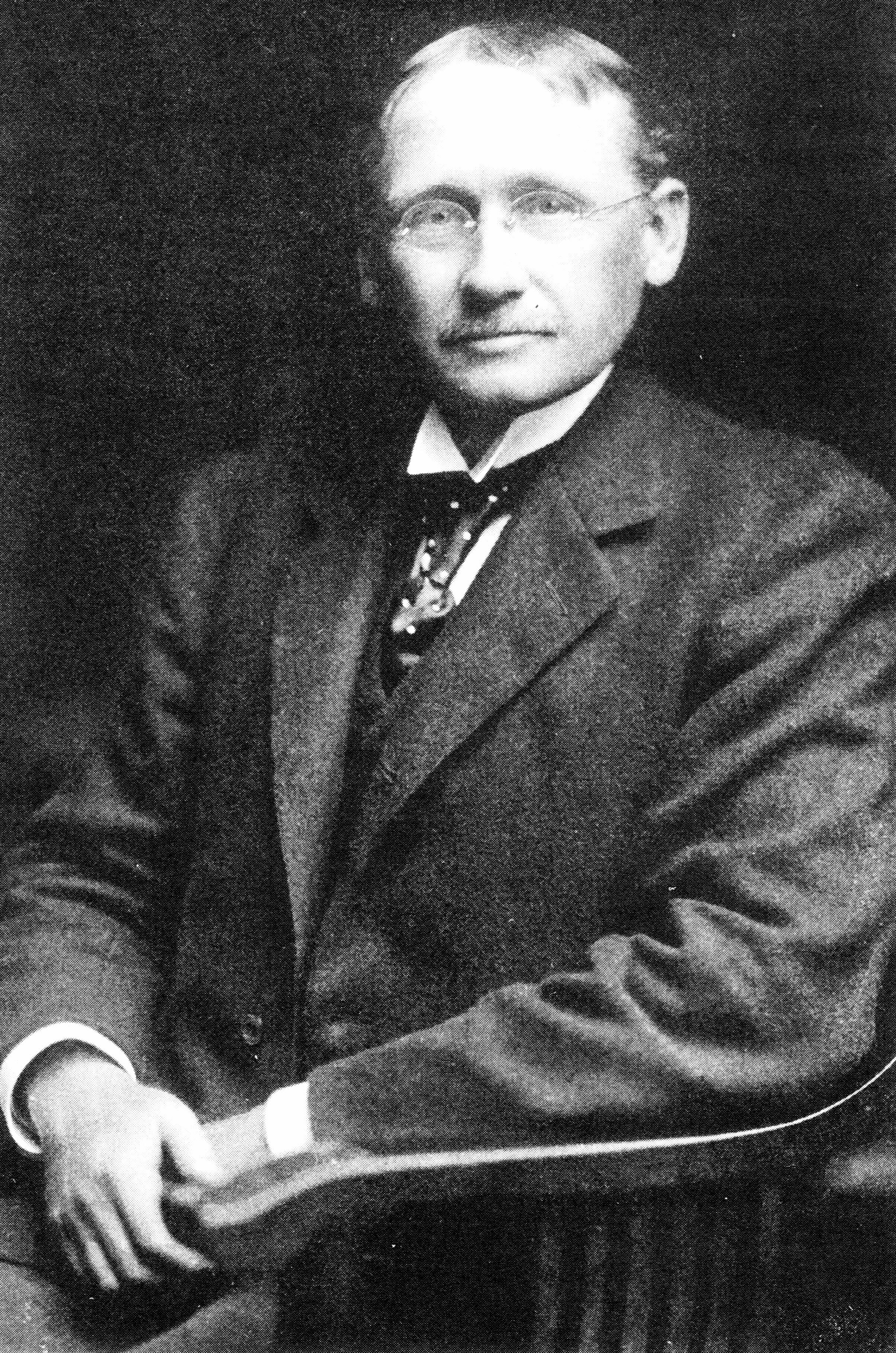
Frederick Taylor (1856–1915), leading proponent of scientific management

Scientific management is a theory of management that analyzes and synthesizes workflows. Its main objective is improving economic efficiency, especially labor productivity. It was one of the earliest attempts to apply science to the engineering of processes in management. Scientific management is sometimes known as Taylorism, after its pioneer, Frederick Winslow Taylor.

Taylor began the theory's development in the United States during the 1880s and 1890s within manufacturing industries, especially steel. Its peak of influence came in the 1910s. Although Taylor died in 1915, by the 1920s scientific management was still influential but had entered into competition and syncretism with opposing and complementary ideas.

Although scientific management as a distinct theory or school of thought was obsolete by the 1930s, most of its themes are still important parts of industrial engineering and management today. These include: analysis; synthesis; logic; rationality; empiricism; work ethic; efficiency through elimination of wasteful activities (as in muda, muri and mura); standardization of best practices; disdain for tradition preserved merely for its own sake or to protect the social status of particular workers with particular skill sets; the transformation of craft production into mass production; and knowledge transfer between workers and from workers into tools, processes, and documentation.

== Name ==
Taylor's own names for his approach initially included "shop management" and "process management". However, "scientific management" came to national attention in 1910 when attorney Louis Brandeis (then not yet Supreme Court justice) popularized the term. Brandeis had sought a consensus term for the approach with the help of practitioners like Henry L. Gantt and Frank B. Gilbreth. Brandeis then used the consensus of "SCIENTIFIC management" when he argued before the Interstate Commerce Commission (ICC) that a proposed increase in railroad rates was unnecessary despite an increase in labor costs; he alleged scientific management would overcome railroad inefficiencies (The ICC ruled against the rate increase, but also dismissed as insufficiently substantiated that concept the railroads were necessarily inefficient.) Taylor recognized the nationally known term "scientific management" as another good name for the concept, and adopted it in the title of his influential 1911 monograph.

== History ==
The Midvale Steel Company, "one of America's great armor plate making plants," was the birthplace of scientific management. In 1877, Frederick W. Taylor started as a clerk in Midvale, but advanced to foreman in 1880. As foreman, Taylor was "constantly impressed by the failure of his [team members] to produce more than about one-third of [what he deemed] a good day's work". Taylor determined to discover, by scientific methods, how long it should take men to perform each given piece of work; and it was in the fall of 1882 that he started to put the first features of scientific management into operation.

Horace Bookwalter Drury, in his 1918 work, Scientific management: A History and Criticism, identified seven other leaders in the movement, most of whom learned of and extended scientific management from Taylor's efforts:

- Henry L. Gantt (1861–1919)
- Carl G. Barth (1860–1939)
- Horace K. Hathaway (1878–1944)
- Morris L. Cooke (1872–1960)
- Sanford E. Thompson (1867–1949)
- Frank B. Gilbreth (1868–1924). Gilbreth's independent work on "motion study" is on record as early as 1885; after meeting Taylor in 1906 and being introduced to scientific management, Gilbreth devoted his efforts to introducing scientific management into factories. Gilbreth and his wife Lillian Moller Gilbreth (1878–1972) performed micro-motion studies using stop-motion cameras as well as developing the profession of industrial/organizational psychology.
- Harrington Emerson (1853–1931) began determining what industrial plants' products and costs were compared to what they ought to be in 1895. Emerson did not meet Taylor until December 1900, and the two never worked together.

Emerson's testimony in late 1910 to the Interstate Commerce Commission brought the movement to national attention and instigated serious opposition. Emerson contended the railroads might save $1,000,000 a day by paying greater attention to efficiency of operation. By January 1911, a leading railroad journal began a series of articles denying they were inefficiently managed.

When steps were taken to introduce scientific management at the government-owned Rock Island Arsenal in early 1911, it was opposed by Samuel Gompers, founder and President of the American Federation of Labor (an alliance of craft unions). When a subsequent attempt was made to introduce the bonus system into the government's Watertown Arsenal foundry during the summer of 1911, the entire force walked out for a few days. Congressional investigations followed, resulting in a ban on the use of time studies and pay premiums in Government service.

Taylor's death in 1915 at age 59 left the movement without its original leader. In management literature today, the term "scientific management" mostly refers to the work of Taylor and his disciples ("classical", implying "no longer current, but still respected for its seminal value") in contrast to newer, improved iterations of efficiency-seeking methods. Today, task-oriented optimization of work tasks is nearly ubiquitous in industry.

== Scientific management principles ==
Frederick Taylor tackled the challenge of making a business productive and profitable in his years of service and research in a steel company. He believed in a scientific solution. In his "Shop Management" article, Taylor explained that there were two facts that appeared "most noteworthy" in the field of management: (a) "Great unevenness": the lack of uniformity in what is called "the management", (b) The lack of relation between good (shop) management and the pay. He added,

"The art of management has been defined, "as knowing exactly what you want men to do, and then seeing that they do it in the best and cheapest way"."

In this regard, he highlighted that although there is "no concise definition" for this art, "the relations between employers and men form without question the most important part of this art". He then continued that a good management must in long run give satisfaction to both managers and workers. Taylor emphasized that he was advocating "high wages" and "low labor cost" as "the foundation of the best management". Discussing the pays for different classes of workers and what he called a "first-class" workman, he compared different scenarios of workmanship and their pros and cons. For best management, he asserted with ample reasons that managers in an organization should follow the following guidelines:

(a) Each worker should be given the highest grade of work they are capable of.

(b) Each worker should be demanded the work that a first-grade worker can do and thrive.

(c) When each worker works at the pace of a first-grade worker, they should be paid 30% to 100% beyond the average of their class.

While Taylor stated that sharing "the equitable division of the profits" is required in an organization, he believed that management could unite high wages with a low labor cost by application of the following principles:

(a) A large daily task: Each worker in the organization, should have a clearly defined task.

(b) Standard conditions: Each worker should be given standard conditions and appliances that will enable him to perform his tasks.

(c) High pay for success: Each worker should be rewarded when he accomplishes their task.

(d) Loss in case of failure: When a worker fails, he should know that he would share the loss.

In Scientific Management, the responsibility of the success or failure of an organization is not solely on the shoulder of the workers, as it is in the old management systems. According to Scientific Management, the managers are taking half of the burden by being responsible for securing the proper work conditions for workers' prosperity. In his book "Principles of Scientific Management", Taylor formally introduced his methodically investigated theory of Scientific Management. Although he explained the details of Scientific Management in his works, he did not provide its concise definition. Shortly before his death, Taylor approved the following summary and definition of Scientific Management that Hoxie prepared:

"Scientific management is a system devised by industrial engineers for the purpose of serving the common interests of employers, workmen and society at large through the elimination of avoidable wastes, the general improvement of the processes and methods of production, and the just and scientific distribution of the product."

Taylor indicated that Scientific Management consisted of four underlying principles:

(a) The development of a true science: We must scientifically analyze all parts of a job. This consists of examining the elements and steps that required to carry out the work, as well as measuring the optimum time for each task. We also need to know the working time per day for a qualified worker.

(b) The scientific selection of the workers: The most suitable person for the job is selected.

(c) The scientific education and training of the workers: There is a clear division of work and responsibility between managers and workers. While workers are carrying out the job with quality and workmanship, managers are responsible for planning, supervision, and proper training of the workers.

(d) Cooperation between managers and workers: Scientific cooperation between managers and workers is required to ensure the proper and high-quality execution of the jobs.

There are various tools that would enable businesses to serve these principles, such as time and motion study, functional foremanship, standardization of tools and movements of workers for each type of work, clear instructions for workers, and cost accounting.

There are many other features, tools, and methods that Taylor developed and recommended during his job at the steel plant and research, which have footprints in other fields, such as accounting and Engineering. Some of his concepts, studies, and findings has led to intellectual revolution in organization management. Taylor made contributions to various fields such as work measurement, production planning and control, process design, quality control, ergonomics, and human engineering.

== Pursuit of economic efficiency ==
Flourishing in the late 19th and early 20th century, scientific management built on earlier pursuits of economic efficiency. While it was prefigured in the folk wisdom of thrift, it favored empirical methods to determine efficient procedures rather than perpetuating established traditions. Thus it was followed by a profusion of successors in applied science, including time and motion study, the Efficiency Movement (which was a broader cultural echo of scientific management's impact on business managers specifically), Fordism, operations management, operations research, industrial engineering, management science, manufacturing engineering, logistics, business process management, business process reengineering, lean manufacturing, and Six Sigma. There is a fluid continuum linking scientific management with the later fields, and the different approaches often display a high degree of compatibility.

Taylor rejected the notion, which was universal in his day and still held today, that the trades, including manufacturing, were resistant to analysis and could only be performed by craft production methods. In the course of his empirical studies, Taylor examined various kinds of manual labor. For example, most bulk materials handling was manual at the time; material handling equipment as we know it today was mostly not developed yet. He looked at shoveling in the unloading of railroad cars full of ore; lifting and carrying in the moving of iron pigs at steel mills; the manual inspection of bearing balls; and others. He discovered many concepts that were not widely accepted at the time. For example, by observing workers, he decided that labor should include rest breaks so that the worker has time to recover from fatigue, either physical (as in shoveling or lifting) or mental (as in the ball inspection case). Workers were allowed to take more rests during work, and productivity increased as a result.

Subsequent forms of scientific management were articulated by Taylor's disciples, such as Henry Gantt; other engineers and managers, such as Benjamin S. Graham; and other theorists, such as Max Weber. Taylor's work also contrasts with other efforts, including those of Henri Fayol and those of Frank Gilbreth, Sr. and Lillian Moller Gilbreth (whose views originally shared much with Taylor's but later diverged in response to Taylorism's inadequate handling of human relations).

== Soldiering ==
Scientific management requires a high level of managerial control over employee work practices and entails a higher ratio of managerial workers to laborers than previous management methods. Such detail-oriented management may cause friction between workers and managers.

Taylor observed that some workers were more talented than others, and that even smart ones were often unmotivated. He observed that most workers who are forced to perform repetitive tasks tend to work at the slowest rate that goes unpunished. This slow rate of work has been observed in many industries and many countries and has been called by various terms. Taylor used the term "soldiering", a term that reflects the way conscripts may approach following orders, and observed that, when paid the same amount, workers will tend to do the amount of work that the slowest among them does. Taylor describes soldiering as "the greatest evil with which the working-people ... are now afflicted".

This reflects the idea that workers have a vested interest in their own well-being, and do not benefit from working above the defined rate of work when it will not increase their remuneration. He, therefore, proposed that the work practice that had been developed in most work environments was crafted, intentionally or unintentionally, to be very inefficient in its execution. He posited that time and motion studies combined with rational analysis and synthesis could uncover one best method for performing any particular task, and that prevailing methods were rarely equal to these best methods. Crucially, Taylor himself prominently acknowledged that if each employee's compensation was linked to their output, their productivity would go up. Thus his compensation plans usually included piece rates. In contrast, some later adopters of time and motion studies ignored this aspect and tried to get large productivity gains while passing little or no compensation gains to the workforce, which contributed to resentment against the system.

== Productivity, automation, and unemployment ==
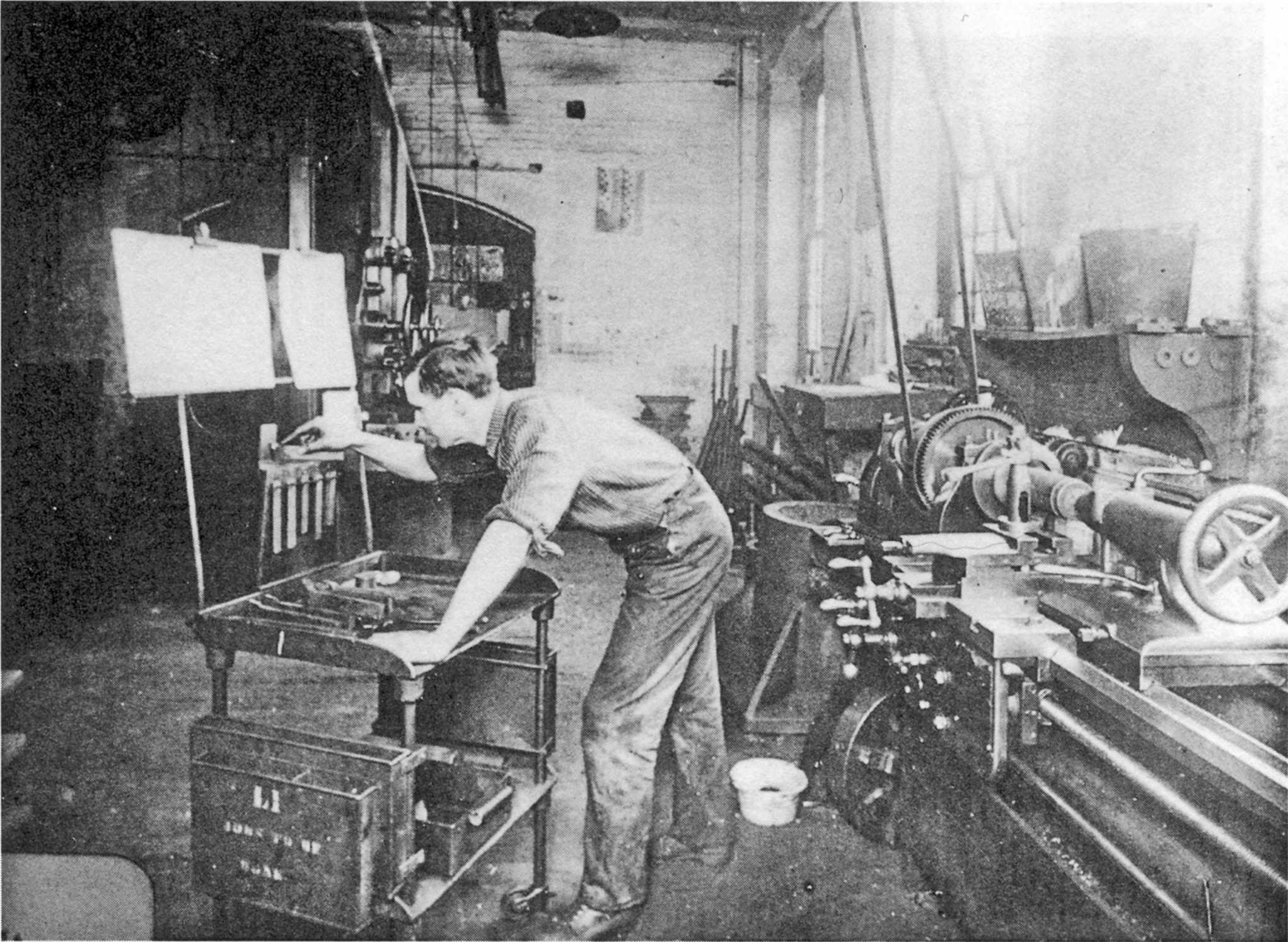
A machinist at the Tabor Company, a firm where Frederick Taylor's consultancy was applied to practice, about 1905

Taylorism led to productivity increases, meaning fewer workers or working hours were needed to produce the same amount of goods. In the short term, productivity increases like those achieved by Taylor's efficiency techniques can cause considerable disruption. Labor relations often become contentious over whether the financial benefits will accrue to owners in the form of increased profits, or workers in the form of increased wages. As a result of decomposition and documentation of manufacturing processes, companies employing Taylor's methods might be able to hire lower-skill workers, enlarging the pool of workers and thus lowering wages and job security.

In the long term, most economists consider productivity increases as a benefit to the economy overall, and necessary to improve the standard of living for consumers in general. By the time Taylor was doing his work, improvements in agricultural productivity had freed up a large portion of the workforce for the manufacturing sector, allowing those workers in turn to buy new types of consumer goods instead of working as subsistence farmers. In later years, increased manufacturing efficiency would free up large sections of the workforce for the service sector. If captured as profits or wages, the money generated by more-productive companies would be spent on new goods and services; if free market competition forces prices down close to the cost of production, consumers effectively capture the benefits and have more money to spend on new goods and services. Either way, new companies and industries spring up to profit from increased demand, and due to freed-up labor are able to hire workers. But the long-term benefits are no guarantee that individual displaced workers will be able to get new jobs that paid them as well or better as their old jobs, as this may require access to education or job training, or moving to different part of the country where new industries are growing. Inability to obtain new employment due to mismatches like these is known as structural unemployment, and economists debate to what extent this is happening in the long term, if at all, as well as the impact on income inequality for those who do find jobs.

Though not foreseen by early proponents of scientific management, detailed decomposition and documentation of an optimal production method also makes automation of the process easier, especially physical processes that would later use industrial control systems and numerical control. Widespread economic globalization also creates opportunity for work to be outsourced to lower-wage areas, with knowledge transfer made easier if an optimal method is already clearly documented. Especially when wages or wage differentials are high, automation and offshoring can result in significant productivity gains and similar questions of who benefits and whether or not technological unemployment is persistent. Because automation is often best suited to tasks that are repetitive and boring, and can also be used for tasks that are dirty, dangerous, and demeaning, proponents believe that in the long run it will free up human workers for more creative, safer, and more enjoyable work.

== Taylorism and unions ==
The early history of labor relations with scientific management in the U.S. was described by Horace Bookwalter Drury:

...for a long time there was thus little or no direct [conflict] between scientific management and organized labor... [However] One of the best known experts once spoke to us with satisfaction of the manner in which, in a certain factory where there had been a number of union men, the labor organization had, upon the introduction of scientific management, gradually disintegrated.

...From 1882 (when the system was started) until 1911, a period of approximately thirty years, there was not a single strike under it, and this in spite of the fact that it was carried on primarily in the steel industry, which was subject to a great many disturbances. For instance, in the general strike in Philadelphia, one man only went out at the Tabor plant [managed by Taylor], while at the Baldwin Locomotive shops across the street two thousand struck.

...Serious opposition may be said to have been begun in 1911, immediately after certain testimony presented before the Interstate Commerce Commission [by Harrington Emerson] revealed to the country the strong movement setting towards scientific management. National labor leaders, wide-awake as to what might happen in the future, decided that the new movement was a menace to their organization, and at once inaugurated an attack... centered about the installation of scientific management in the government arsenal at Watertown.

In 1911, organized labor erupted with strong opposition to scientific management, including from Samuel Gompers, founder and president of the American Federation of Labor (AFL).

Once the time-and-motion men had completed their studies of a particular task, the workers had very little opportunity for further thinking, experimenting, or suggestion-making. Taylorism was criticized for turning the worker into an "automaton" or "machine", making work monotonous and unfulfilling by doing one small and rigidly defined piece of work instead of using complex skills with the whole production process done by one person. "The further 'progress' of industrial development... increased the anomic or forced division of labor," the opposite of what Taylor thought would be the effect. Some workers also complained about being made to work at a faster pace and producing goods of lower quality.

TRADE UNION OBJECTIONS TO SCIENTIFIC MANAGEMENT: ...It intensifies the modern tendency toward specialization of the work and the task... displaces skilled workers and... weakens the bargaining strength of the workers through specialization of the task and the destruction of craft skill. ...leads to over-production and the increase of unemployment... looks upon the worker as a mere instrument of production and reduces him to a semi-automatic attachment to the machine or tool... tends to undermine the worker's health, shortens his period of industrial activity and earning power, and brings on premature old age. — Scientific Management and Labor, Robert F. Hoxie, 1915 report to the Commission on Industrial Relations

Owing to its application in part in government arsenals, and a strike by the union molders against some of its features as they were introduced in the foundry at the Watertown Arsenal, "scientific management" received much publicity.
The House of Representatives appointed a committee, consisting of Congressman William B. Wilson, William C. Redfield and John Q. Tilson to investigate the system as it had been applied in the Watertown Arsenal. In its report to Congress this committee sustained Labor's contention that the system forced abnormally high speed upon workmen, that its disciplinary features were arbitrary and harsh, and that the use of a stop-watch and the payment of a bonus were injurious to the worker's manhood and welfare. At a succeeding session of Congress a measure was passed which prohibited the further use of the stop-watch and the payment of a premium or bonus to workmen in government establishments.
When the federal Commission on Industrial Relations began its work it was decided that a further investigation of "scientific management" should be made, and Mr. Robert F. Hoxie, Professor of Economics at the University of Chicago, was selected to undertake the work. [ ... ]
Mr. Hoxie was to devote a year to his investigation, and [ ... ] it was deemed advsiable that he should be accompanied by two men [ ... ]
One of those appointed was Mr. Robert G. Valentine [formerly Commissioner of Indian Affairs, but "at this time a management consultant in private practice" according to Aitken] [ ... ]

The other expert was to be a trade unionist, and I [John P. Frey] was honored with the appointment.

— John P. Frey. "Scientific Management and Labor". American Federationist. 22 (4): 257 (April 1916)

The Watertown Arsenal in Massachusetts provides an example of the application and repeal of the Taylor system in the workplace, due to worker opposition. In the early 20th century, neglect in the Watertown shops included overcrowding, dim lighting, lack of tools and equipment, and questionable management strategies in the eyes of the workers. Frederick W. Taylor and Carl G. Barth visited Watertown in April 1909 and reported on their observations at the shops. Their conclusion was to apply the Taylor system of management to the shops to produce better results. Efforts to install the Taylor system began in June 1909. Over the years of time study and trying to improve the efficiency of workers, criticisms began to evolve. Workers complained of having to compete with one another, feeling strained and resentful, and feeling excessively tired after work. In June 1913, employees of the Watertown Arsenal petitioned to abolish the practice of scientific management there. A number of magazine writers inquiring into the effects of scientific management found that the "conditions in shops investigated contrasted favorably with those in other plants".

A committee of the U.S. House of Representatives investigated and reported in 1912, advocating standardization and systematizing, but not a stop-watch time study without consent of workmen. Scientific management gave production managers a dangerously high level of uncontrolled power. After an attitude survey of the workers revealed a high level of resentment and hostility towards scientific management, the Senate banned Taylor's methods at the arsenal.

Taylor had a largely negative view of unions, and believed they only led to decreased productivity. Efforts to resolve conflicts with workers included methods of scientific collectivism, making agreements with unions, and the personnel management movement.

== Relationship to Fordism ==
It is often assumed that Fordism derives from Taylor's work. Taylor apparently made this assumption himself when visiting the Ford Motor Company's Michigan plants not too long before he died, but it is likely that the methods at Ford were evolved independently, and that any influence from Taylor's work was indirect at best. Charles E. Sorensen, a principal of the company during its first four decades, disclaimed any connection at all. There was a belief at Ford, which remained dominant until Henry Ford II took over the company in 1945, that the world's experts were worthless, because if Ford had listened to them, it would have failed to attain its great successes. Henry Ford felt that he had succeeded in spite of, not because of, experts, who had tried to stop him in various ways (disagreeing about price points, production methods, car features, business financing, and other issues). Sorensen thus was dismissive of Taylor and lumped him into the category of useless experts.

Sorensen held the New England machine tool vendor Walter Flanders in high esteem and credits him for the efficient floorplan layout at Ford, claiming that Flanders knew nothing about Taylor. Flanders may have been exposed to the spirit of Taylorism elsewhere, and may have been influenced by it, but he did not cite it when developing his production technique. Regardless, the Ford team apparently did independently invent modern mass production techniques in the period of 1905–1915, and they themselves were not aware of any borrowing from Taylorism. Perhaps it is only possible with hindsight to see the zeitgeist that (indirectly) connected the budding Fordism to the rest of the efficiency movement during the decade of 1905–1915.

== Adoption in planned economies ==
Scientific management appealed to managers of planned economies because central economic planning relies on the idea that the expenses that go into economic production can be precisely predicted and can be optimized by design.

=== Soviet Union ===
By 1913 Vladimir Lenin wrote that the "most widely discussed topic today in Europe, and to some extent in Russia, is the 'system' of the American engineer, Frederick Taylor"; Lenin decried it as merely a "'scientific' system of sweating" more work from laborers. Again in 1914, Lenin derided Taylorism as "man's enslavement by the machine".

However, in 1918, after the Russian Revolutions brought him to power, Lenin wrote that the "Russian is a bad worker [who must] learn to work. The Taylor system... is a combination of the refined brutality of bourgeois exploitation and a number of the greatest scientific achievements in the field of analysing mechanical motions during work, the elimination of superfluous and awkward motions, the elaboration of correct methods of work, the introduction of the best system of accounting and control, etc. The Soviet Republic must at all costs adopt all that is valuable in the achievements of science and technology in this field."

In the Soviet Union, Taylorism was advocated by Aleksei Gastev and nauchnaia organizatsia truda ("the movement for the scientific organization of labor"), which found support from both Vladimir Lenin and Leon Trotsky. Gastev continued to promote this system of labor management until his arrest and execution in 1939. During the 1920s and 1930s, the Soviet Union enthusiastically embraced Fordism and Taylorism, importing American experts in both fields as well as American engineering firms to build parts of its new industrial infrastructure. Charles Sorensen was one of the consultants who brought American know-how to the USSR during this era. The concepts of the Five Year Plan and the centrally planned economy can be traced directly to the influence of Taylorism on Soviet thinking. As scientific management was believed to epitomize American efficiency, Lenin's successor, Joseph Stalin, even claimed that "the combination of the Russian revolutionary sweep with American efficiency is the essence of Leninism."

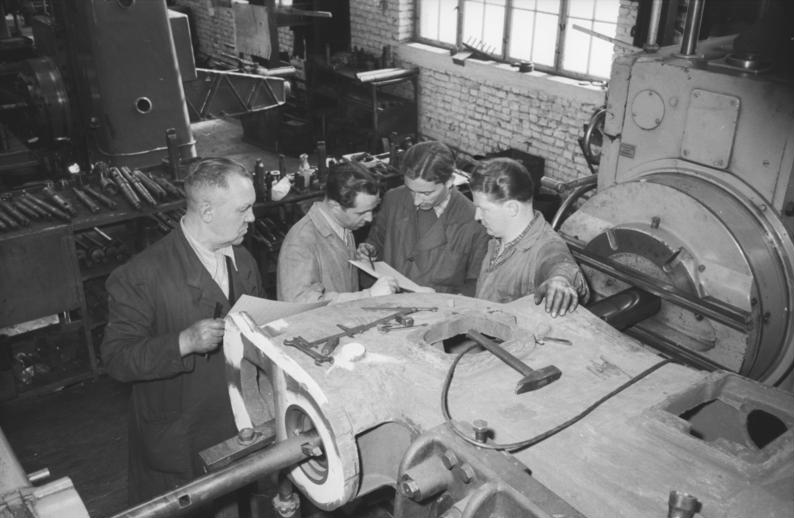
Photograph of East German machine tool builders in 1953, from the German Federal Archives. The workers are discussing standards specifying how each task should be done and how long it should take.

== Criticism of rigor ==
Taylor believed that the scientific method of management included the calculations of exactly how much time it takes a man to do a particular task, or his rate of work. Critics of Taylor complained that such a calculation relies on certain arbitrary, non-scientific decisions such as what constituted the job, which men were timed, and under which conditions. Any of these factors are subject to change, and therefore can produce inconsistencies. Some dismiss so-called "scientific management" or Taylorism as pseudoscience. Others are critical of the representativeness of the workers Taylor selected to take his measurements.

== Variations of scientific management after Taylorism ==
=== In the 1900s ===
Taylorism was one of the first attempts to systematically treat management and process improvement as a scientific problem, and Taylor is considered a founder of modern industrial engineering. Later methods took a broader approach, measuring not only productivity but quality. With the advancement of statistical methods, systematized quality assurance and quality control began in the 1920s and 1930s. During the 1940s and 1950s, the body of knowledge for doing scientific management evolved into operations management, operations research, and management cybernetics. In the 1980s total quality management became widely popular, growing from quality control techniques. Today's Six Sigma and lean manufacturing could be seen as new kinds of scientific management. Newer methods are all based on systematic analysis rather than relying on tradition and rule of thumb.

Other thinkers, even in Taylor's own time, also proposed considering the individual worker's needs, not just the needs of the process. Critics said that in Taylorism, "the worker was taken for granted as a cog in the machinery." James Hartness published The Human Factor in Works Management in 1912, while Frank Gilbreth and Lillian Moller Gilbreth offered their own alternatives to Taylorism. The human relations school of management (founded by the work of Elton Mayo) evolved in the 1930s as a counterpoint or complement of scientific management. Taylorism focused on the organization of the work process, and human relations helped workers adapt to the new procedures. Modern definitions of "quality control" like ISO-9000 include not only clearly documented and optimized manufacturing tasks, but also consideration of human factors like expertise, motivation, and organizational culture. The Toyota Production System, from which lean manufacturing in general is derived, includes "respect for people" and teamwork as core principles.

Peter Drucker saw Frederick Taylor as the creator of knowledge management, because the aim of scientific management was to produce knowledge about how to improve work processes. Although the typical application of scientific management was manufacturing, Taylor himself advocated scientific management for all sorts of work, including the management of schools, universities and government. For example, Taylor believed scientific management could be extended to "the work of our salesmen". Shortly after his death, Harlow S. Person began to lecture corporate audiences on the possibility of using Taylorism for "sales engineering", which is now referred to as sales process engineering.

=== In the 2000s ===
Modern human resources can be seen to have begun in the scientific management era, most notably in the writings of Katherine M. H. Blackford. One approach to efficiency in information work is called digital Taylorism, which uses software to monitor the performance of employees who work on computers.

Practices descended from scientific management are used in offices and in medicine (e.g. managed care).

== See also ==
- American system of manufacturing
- Cheaper by the Dozen
- Hawthorne effect
- Henry Louis Le Châtelier (1850–1936), industrial chemist and author of French language texts on Taylorism
- Modern Times (film)
- The Pajama Game
- Pandora's Box
- Hans Renold (1852–1943), credited with introducing Taylorism to Britain
- Stakhanovism
- Theory X and Theory Y
- Henry R. Towne (1844–1924), ASME President and author of the seminal The Engineer as An Economist (1886)
- Words per minute
- Exploitation
