= Clarence Northcott =

Australian sociologist and business manager

Clarence Hunter Northcott (1880–1968) was an Australian sociologist and manager at the Rowntree's Works at York. He was influential in the development of the Chartered Institute of Personnel and Development.

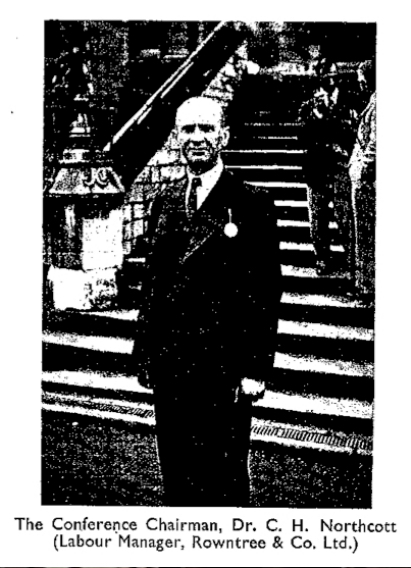

== Education ==
Northcott was educated at the University of Sydney before undertaking a PhD in sociology at Columbia University. His doctorate was supervised by the former President of the American Sociological Association, Franklin Henry Giddings, and published as Australian Social Development in 1918.

During his studies Northcott, a practicing Methodist, believed that social science should serve a Christian mission so taught at the Workers' Educational Association.

== Rowntree's ==
In 1919 Northcott was recruited by Seebohm Rowntree to work in labour management at Rowntree's Cocoa Works in York, where he remained for the rest of his career. Here, he worked alongside such Rowntree figures as Lyndall Urwick and Oliver Sheldon, the latter of whom was initially employed under Northcott.

He was a key organiser in Rowntree's Oxford Management conferences and was Chairman of the Labour section of Rowntree's Management Research Groups.

== Bedaux B and Rowntree Mark ==
During the 1920s, Northcott travelled to the United States to investigate factory organisation methods including the Bedaux System.

In 1932, Northcott wrote in Unity that he was unimpressed by the Bedaux Unit, it being very similar to the Haynes Manit Man-Minute.

He also explained that he did not approve of using management consultants to introduce work measurement systems and that the Bedaux Unit was not new: Rowntree's Cocoa Works had been using an almost identical unit, the Mark, to measure many of its 7,000 workers since 1923.

== The Incentives and Contentment studies ==
From 1929, Northcott led the Incentives and Contentment studies at the Rowntree Cocoa Works. These workplace experiments lasted for four years, being published as a book in 1938, featuring a foreword by Seebohm Rowntree. Northcott and his researchers found that pay incentives were the most effective way of stimulating better work.

Incentives and Contentment was reviewed by labour managers, sociologists and economists, all of whom compared the Rowntree experiments to the American Hawthorne studies. In the postwar period, the Incentives and Contentment studies became overshadowed by the Hawthorne studies which found, in contrast, that social incentives were more effective than pay.

== Influence on human resources ==
While Labour Manager at Rowntree's, in 1931 Northcott reframed the Institute of Industrial Welfare Workers into the Institute of Labour Management. He was also President (1941-3) and Director (1949–50) of its successor, the Institute of Personnel Management, now the Chartered Institute of Personnel and Development.

== Publications ==
- Northcott, C.H., Australian Social Development (New York: Longmans, Green & Co., 1918).
- Northcott, Clarence, Sheldon, Oliver, Wardropper, J.W., Urwick, L., Factory Organization (London: Isaac Pitman, 1928).
- Northcott, C.H., Personnel Management: Its Scope and Practice (3rd edition, London: Sir Isaac Pitman and Sons, 1947).
- Northcott, C.H. (ed), African Labour Efficiency Survey (London, 1949)
- Northcott, C.H., Christian Principles in Industry (London, 1958)
