= Charles Bedaux =

American businessman (1886-1944)

Charles Eugène Bedaux
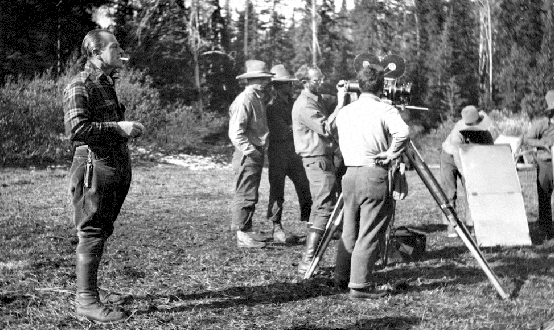
- Bedaux with his film crew in Canada in 1934
- Born: October 26, 1886; Paris, France
- Died: February 18, 1944 (aged 57); Miami, Florida, U.S.
- Cause of death: Suicide by drug overdose
- Occupations: Production engineer, management consultant
- Spouses: Blanche de Kressier Allen (m. 1908; div. 1917) Fern Lombard (m. 1917–1944)
- Children: 1

Charles Eugène Bedaux (10 October 1886 – 18 February 1944) was a French-American millionaire who made his fortune developing and implementing the work measurement aspect of scientific management, notably the Bedaux System. Bedaux was friends with British royalty and Nazis alike, and was a management consultant, big game hunter and explorer. In 1934, he was the fifth wealthiest man in the United States.

== Early years ==
Charles Bedaux was born in the Charenton-le-Pont commune, suburb of Paris, France. He was one of five children. His father worked for the French railroad system, and though his two brothers Daniel and Gaston became engineers, Charles became a school dropout. Charles worked a series of menial jobs before befriending Henri Ledoux, a successful pimp from the infamous Pigalle district. The mysterious Ledoux apparently taught Bedaux lessons on proper dress, confidence and street-fighting, but was murdered in 1906.

On 14 February 1906, Charles moved to the United States, where in 1917 he became a United States citizen. In 1908, Bedaux married Blanche de Kressier Allen, and in 1909, their son, Charles Emile Bedaux (1909–1993) was born. He would later claim in interviews to have worked as a restaurant bottle-washer, a sandhog, and at the New Jersey Worsted Mills in Hoboken.

In 1908, he started working for Mallinckrodt Chemical in St. Louis, then in 1912, for McKesson & Robbins in New York City. He then worked as an interpreter for A.M. Morrini, an Italian industrial engineering firm studying efficiency measurements. Bedaux accompanied Morrini to Europe, where Bedaux started working for Louis Duez's consulting company in 1913.

In August 1914, Bedaux enlisted in the French Foreign Legion, but was soon discharged for medical reasons. Bedaux returned to the US, settling his family in Grand Rapids, Michigan. In 1917, Bedaux divorced Blanche, and married Fern Lombard on 2 July.

== Bedaux B ==
The Bedaux company logo, featuring its distinctive "B" unit with an hourglass, 1920.

Charles E. Bedaux: The Bedaux Unit Principle of Industrial Measurement, Journal of Applied Psychology, 1921. PDF, click to read.

Bedaux was one of the leading contributors in the field of work measurement or labor measurement, one aspect of the scientific management movement. In this, he was strongly influenced by F. W. Taylor's book Shop Management, particularly Taylor's time-study practices, and Charles E. Knoeppel's writings on industrial layout and routing. Building on their work, he introduced the concept of rating assessment, which led to improvements in the comparability of employee and departmental efficiency. He named this the "Bedaux System of Human Power Measurement".

The distinguishing feature of the Bedaux System was its use of the Bedaux Unit or B, a universal measure for all manual work. The "B" was defined as fractions of a minute allocated to work or rest. Productivity goals were set for so many B's per hour, and bonuses were paid for exceeding that goal. This method of standardization replaced piece work payment, increasing productivity and reducing costs. Bedaux also mimicked Frank Gilbreth by introducing a motion study Kodascope package which he propagated with an early Bedaux client, Kodak.

== Management consultancy ==
Bedaux became associated with one of Taylor's circles, Harrington Emerson, whose management consultancy firm, The Emerson Institute, Bedaux emulated in engineering and other sectors of modern industrial economies.

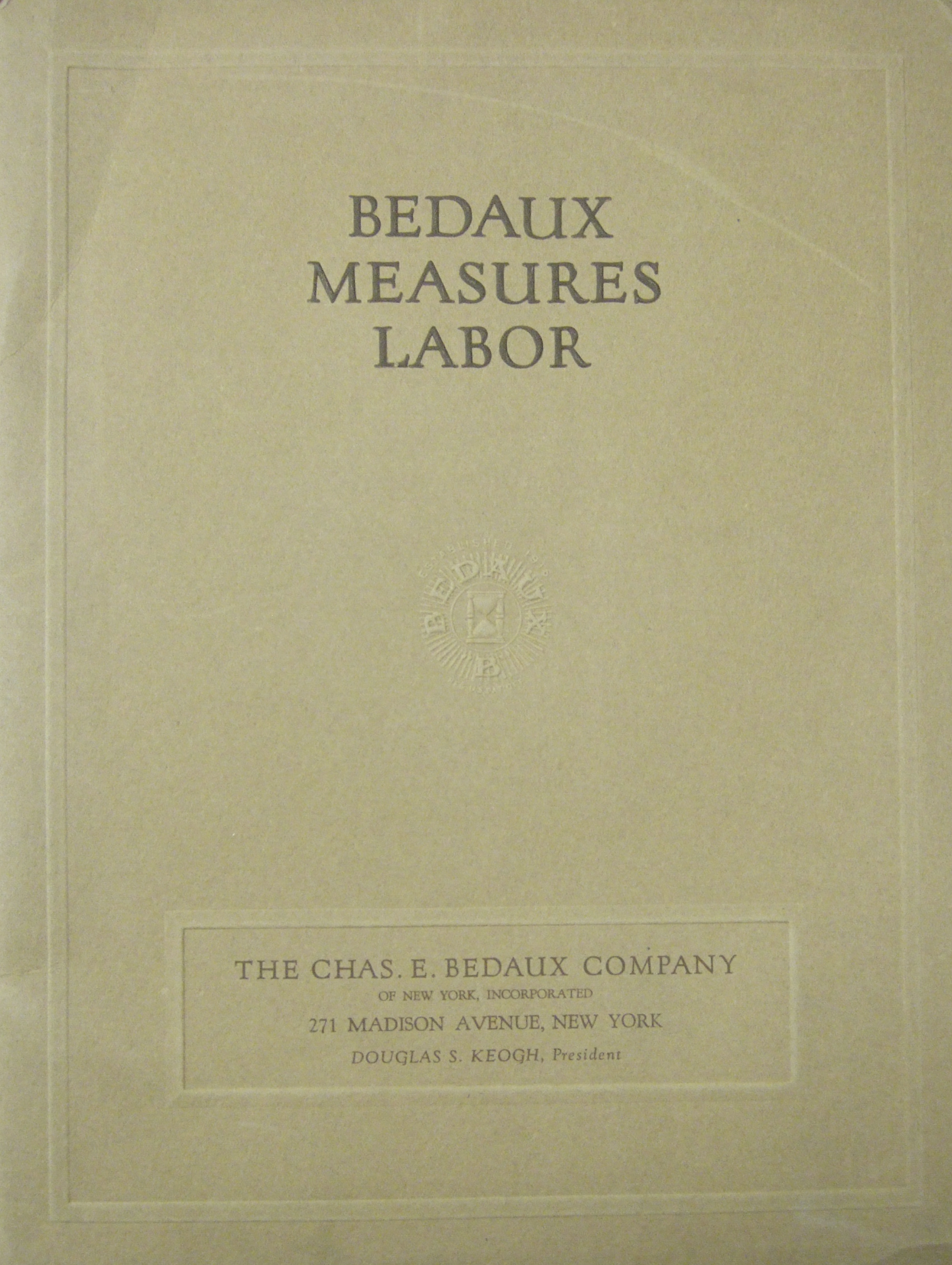
"Bedaux measures labor". Bedaux consultancy advertising booklet, 1928.

In 1916 he established a consulting firm in Grand Rapids, and in 1918 moved his headquarters to Cleveland. In 1924, the Bedaux "B System" was adopted by Eastman Kodak at its facilities in the U.K., and in 1926, Charles E. Bedaux Ltd. was established in London. Offices in Italy and Germany followed in 1927, and in France in 1929. In 1932, Bedaux International was founded in Amsterdam. By 1934, the Bedaux System was being used in 21 countries. Early U.S. clients were in the furniture assembly and rubber industries of Grand Rapids, Michigan. His firm's slogan was Bedaux Measures Labor and its logo incorporated an egg timer motif.

The Bedaux consultancy firm was one of the first of its kind, and within a decade its success led to the creation of a series of consultancy firms throughout the United States, Europe, and eventually Africa, India, Australia, and the Orient administered by the parent company, Bedaux Internationale.

Major Bedaux clients included DuPont, Imperial Chemical Industries, Anglo-Persian Oil Company (later BP), Fiat, and Campbell's.

== Labor resistance ==
The Bedaux system was introduced at Campbell's in 1927, where B standards were 'the cause of the majority of the shop floor battles between management and labor' for years. In 1929, the Taylor Society supported Southern textile workers in their strike against the Bedaux System, which textile workers believed was 'even worse than the old "Taylor Stop-Watch System"'. There were also a long series of labor disputes regarding the Bedaux system within the U.S. lumber industry in the Pacific Northwest region from 1931 to 1935 involving the Loyal Legion of Loggers and Lumbermen (4L)

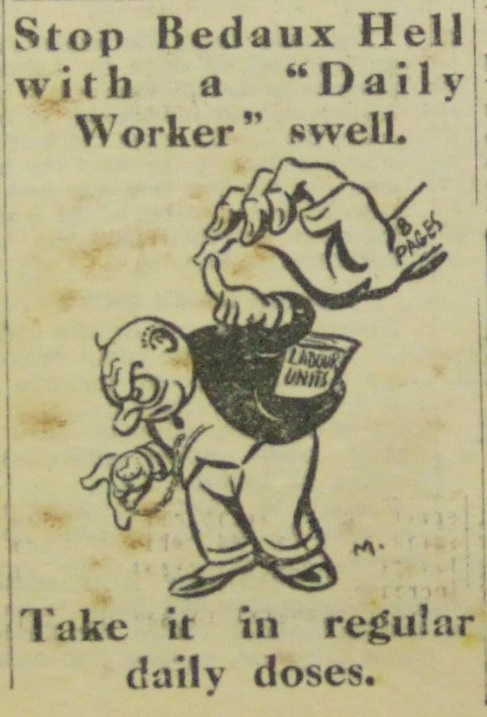
"Stop Bedaux Hell with a "Daily Worker" swell." A cartoon attacking the Bedaux B in the Daily Worker, 1935.

Bedaux Britain had several labor issues: in 1929, there was a strike over the Bedaux System at the Rover plant in Coventry. In winter 1931–2, women workers struck over the introduction of the Bedaux System at Wolsey in Leicester. Additionally, in 1934 the introduction of the Bedaux System at Richard Johnson and Nephew in Manchester precipitated a strike which lasted for months. In this case, the wiredrawers' union took their employers to court over the Bedaux System but eventually lost their case.

One of Bedaux's principal operations in Italy was at the iconic Fiat plant in Turin, whose founder Giovanni Agnelli was also director of the Società Italiana Bedaux. These management interventions were later publicized by the founder of the Italian Communist Party, Antonio Gramsci, whose Prison Notebooks analyzed the ramifications of Taylorism at the plant. The Bedaux System also met with resistance at the Pertusola mines in Sardinia.

== Bedaux Britain Ltd. ==
Of Bedaux's business empire, Bedaux Britain was particularly lucrative. Here, the Bedaux Unit was so successful that it was copied by industrial firms such as Rowntree's of York (a corporate member of the Taylor Society), Mander Brothers of Wolverhampton, and influential consultancies including Urwick, Orr & Partners.

Bedaux Britain formed the basis for all four of the 'Big Four' European consultancies in the postwar period: Associated Industrial Consultants (AIC), Urwick, Orr & Partners (UOP), Production-Engineering (P-E) and PA Consulting (PA).

In focusing on factory floor and office efficiency issues, the 'Big Four' Bedauxist consultancies were successful across Western Europe until the 1960s, when they were largely overtaken by U.S. consultancies such as McKinsey & Company, whose efforts were in higher-value activities such as strategy and restructuring.

== Bedaux Canadian Sub-Arctic Expedition ==
The Bedaux Canadian Sub-Arctic Expedition was the grand title Bedaux gave to the expedition he organized to cross the wilderness of northern British Columbia, Canada in 1934. Mostly, the expedition was a publicity stunt, but it was also undertaken to test the new Citroën half-track cars that were being developed by Bedaux's friend André Citroën.

Key moments during the journey were filmed by Academy Award-winning cinematographer Floyd Crosby, who would later be praised for his work on the feature film High Noon. Also along for the trip were several dozen Alberta cowboys and a large film crew. To map the route of the expedition, the Canadian government sent two geographers, Frank Swannell and Ernest Lemarque.

The expedition started at Edmonton, Alberta on 6 July 1934, and their goal was to travel 1500 miles to Telegraph Creek, British Columbia. Much of the trip would have to be made through regions that were relatively uncharted and had no trails. The party failed to reach their destination, and the original movie was never made, but in 1995, Canadian director, George Ungar, produced a television biography of Bedaux incorporating Crosby's footage of the expedition, The Champagne Safari (1995).

Prior to this expedition, Bedaux made an automobile journey of 9500 miles from Mombasa to Casablanca in 1929–30. Then in 1939, he and his wife, Fern, completed another such journey of 9500 miles from Cape Town to Cairo.

== Duke and Duchess of Windsor ==
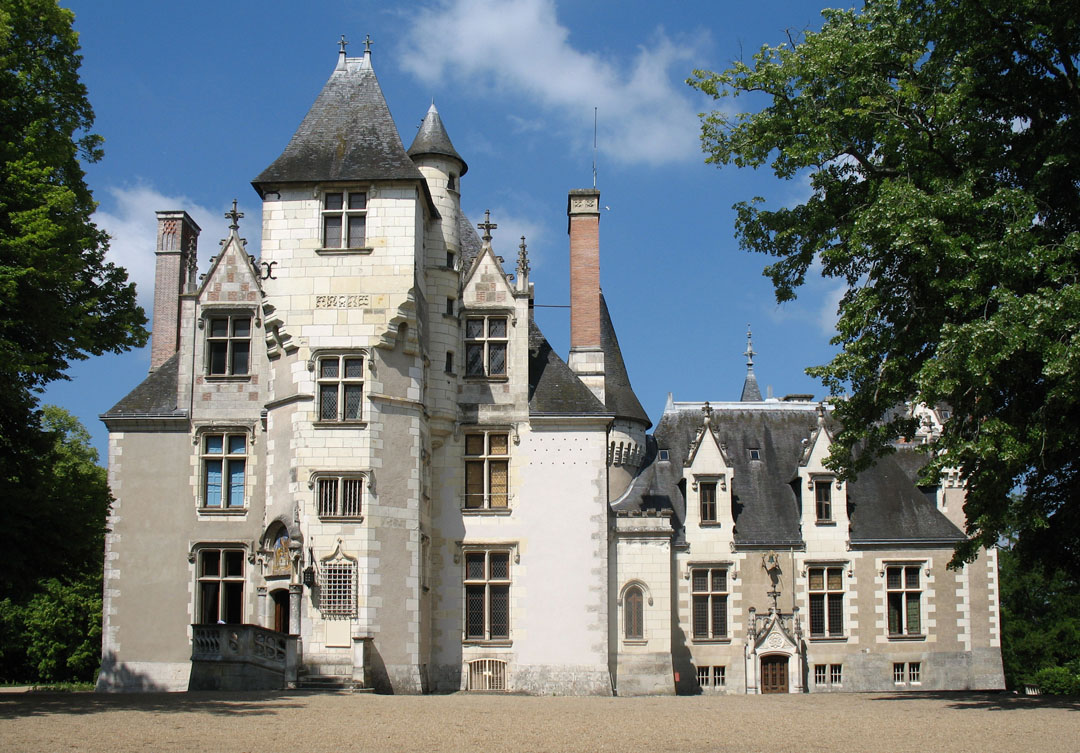
The Château de Candé, where Charles Bedaux hosted the Windsors' wedding. Photo 2007.

In 1927, Bedaux purchased the sixteenth-century Château de Candé in Indre-et-Loire, France and lived there with his second wife, the former Fern Lombard (1892–1972), a daughter of lawyer James Lombard of Grand Rapids, Michigan. The couple renovated the château, completing the work in 1930.

On 3 June 1937, Charles and Fern Bedaux hosted the wedding of Wallis Simpson and Prince Edward, Duke of Windsor at the château. To Bedaux's delight, the Windsors enthusiastically embraced the idea of making a tour of Nazi Germany. Bedaux arranged the couple's visit, where they publicly met the Führer, Adolf Hitler. Arriving in Berlin that October, the couple were greeted by an SS band playing God Save The King while crowds chanted: We want the Duchess! Parties and receptions followed, and the Duchess, who had felt snubbed in England, noted with satisfaction that all the leading Nazis bowed or curtsied to her. The Windsors toured factories, coal mines, and the training school of the elite Death's Head Division of the SS. Edward rewarded his hosts with a fulsome speech in praise of Nazi Germany and delivered a Nazi salute.

=== Duke and Duchess's USA tour ===
The next stage of the trip, the United States, was cancelled due to labor union, press, and public outrage at Bedaux's involvement. He was quickly demonized in the media around the globe. Specifically, the Baltimore Federation of Labor publicly attacked the 'emissaries of dictatorships or uniformed sentimentalists' and called the Bedaux System a 'vicious adaptation of the Taylor System'.

From then on, commentators linked Bedaux and his B system with fascism, and Taylor's remaining supporters, particularly those in the Taylor Society, disowned Bedaux. The fiasco prompted many employers using the Bedaux System, and those derived from it, to change its terminology to more neutral and administrative language. This explains why historical research into the enduring influence of the Bedaux System and its Bedaux Unit has been reported as difficult to undertake.

== Activity during the Second World War ==
After the surrender of France to the Germans in 1940 and the occupation of Paris, Bedaux became acquainted with leading Nazi and Vichy figures, and he was appointed as an economic advisor to the Vichy regime and the Reich. Bedaux's wife, Fern, and her sister, Eve Duez (Mme Louis S Duez), were interned briefly in Paris but were soon released through their connections to the German occupation authorities. In 1941, Bedaux experimented with a political-economic system of his own invention, Equivalism, in Roquefort, Vichy France, though recent research has shown that the experiments amounted to tinkering which locals hardly noticed. Also in May–June, 1941, there was a violent coal strike over the Bedaux System in the Nord and Pas de Calais in occupied France.

Bedaux's German connections were not restricted to occupied France. In October 1941 he was designated by the sabotage branch of the Abwehr (Abwehr II) to command a covert mission to Persia (Iran) to capture the refinery at Abadan from his former client, the Anglo-Persian Oil Company, and protect it from Allied bombardment prior to a planned German military invasion of Iraq and Persia. By the end of 1942, however, strategic events (e.g. the Second Battle of El Alamein and the Battle of Stalingrad) had rendered the operation unworkable, and Berlin lost interest in Bedaux. The countersabotage plan then became obsolete, though it looked suspicious when Bedaux was later investigated by the FBI and MI5.

Despite Bedaux's cultivation of relationships with various Abwehr and Nazi Party officials, declassified National Archives and Records Administration records indicate that Bedaux did not have connections to the upper echelons of the Party or with officials of the Sicherheitsdienst (SS Security Service).

== Bedaux's arrest and suicide ==
In December, 1942, shortly after the Allied military landings in North Africa in Operation Torch, Bedaux was in Algeria promoting the construction of water and peanut oil pipelines between West Africa and the Mediterranean coast for the benefit of Allied forces (he had been in contact with various U.S. consular officials about this for some time, hence the U.S. had a thick file on him). He and his son were arrested by the French on behalf of the OSS and transferred to the Americans. He was kept in custody without charge for a year.

Bedaux was eventually flown to the US, and, awaiting charges of trading with the enemy and treason, killed himself by taking an overdose of barbiturates while in FBI custody in the Dade County Prison in Miami, Florida. He was pronounced dead at Jackson Memorial Hospital. His death featured prominently in the contemporary US media, where Bedaux had few friends. Most notable was a biographical trilogy about him by Janet Flanner. Flanner attacked the Bedaux System and Bedaux Unit as not differing 'much from the old Frederick Winslow Taylor shop-management system of the nineties' (1890s), despite Bedaux's verbose claims to originality.

== Posthumous reputation ==
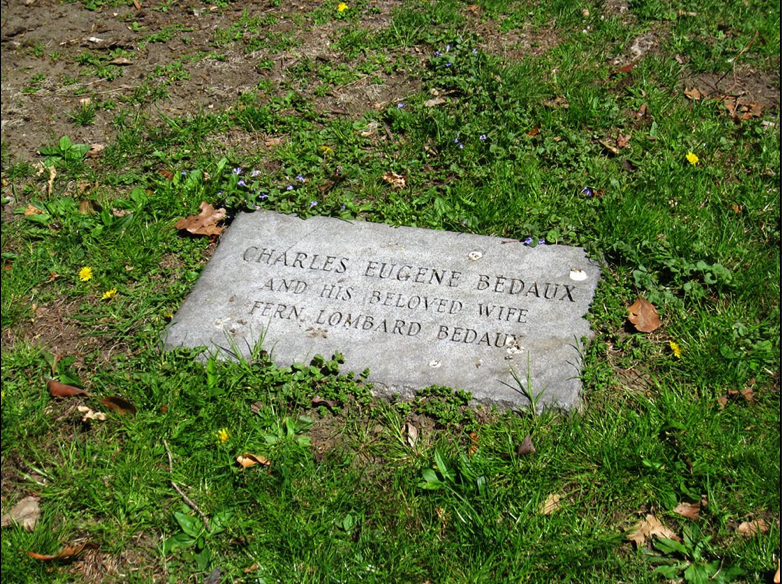
Charles Bedaux (1886–1944) and his wife Fern Lombard Bedaux grave, 2017.

The circumstances of Bedaux's death and his posthumous influence remain subjects of research inquiry. Despite his contemporary prominence in the media and in business and consultancy circles, Bedaux was not even mentioned along with F.W. Taylor, Hans Renold and Charles Myers in the Making of Scientific Management trilogy by Lyndall Urwick and E.F.L. Brech. He was also not discussed in Urwick's comprehensive management prosopography The Golden Book of Management. The reason for these omissions remain controversial to this day.

It has also been suggested that, in an attempt to restore Bedaux's reputation, the French government awarded Bedaux a posthumous Légion d'honneur on the grounds that he had actually obstructed the Germans and guarded Jewish property in France. But recent research has been unable to prove the existence of this award.

A street in Tours, the Avenue Charles Bedaux, was named after Bedaux from 1966 to 2018.

The Château de Candé is open to public visitors, and the main theme of the tour is the Duke and Duchess' wedding there in 1937. Many of Bedaux's possessions are on display at the chateau.

== Bedaux in popular culture ==
Bedaux's most famous depiction in interwar culture was as a crackpot inventor in Charlie Chaplin's Modern Times who presents a 'Beddoes' or 'Billowes' 'Feeding Machine' to Chaplin's employer. The malfunctioning contraption was then demonstrated on a restrained and tormented Chaplin.

In addition, the 'Bedaux belt' featured in George Orwell's Inside the Whale, alongside other items and people, such as Hitler and Stalin, which Orwell saw as indicative of the dark side of the period.

Following his death in 1944, Bedaux features as a character in Upton Sinclair's 1945 novel Dragon Harvest.

Bedaux also appears as a thwarted efficiency expert, Monsieur Bedou of Ratio Ltd., in Pierre Boulle's Sacrilege in Malaya (1951).

== Conspiracy theories ==
Several conspiracy theories surround Bedaux's life and death. They usually cite Bedaux as a conduit between the Nazi and British elites, who facilitated important events in World War II such as the fall of France and the alleged murder of Heinrich Himmler by British intelligence operatives. These stories stem both from contemporary sensationalist media stories following Bedaux's well-publicised suicide and in publications which followed the FBI's release of the Bedaux files in the early 1980s. These claims have been subject to recent investigation.

At the time of his death, some suggested that Bedaux was either killed or allowed to kill himself in order to prevent him from implicating other prominent businessmen.

According to Edwin A. Lahey:

"Bedaux submitted a list of names of people who he said would testify favorably as to his character, his integrity and his complete loyalty to the United States. Many of these names are in 'Who's Who in America.' Some are the names of executives of large corporations which either have German holdings or have been named defendants in government suits against international cartels whose machinations with the Nazis did so much to stymie our own preparedness for war. At least one person is widely known in politics. Another is an important financier. Another is a big steel producer, with mills in Germany.

One editorial, which was titled Dead Men Don't Blab, explicitly suggested this:

"It will be too bad if the late Charles E. Bedaux is allowed to sink into limbo without causing more than a one-day ripple in the headlines. Charles Bedaux not only had many influential friends, but also a vast host of enemies – all the democrats of the world. It is, however, his enemies who should mourn his death for if he had lived until he had told all, they might have learned much to their advantage. Many of his friends, on the other hand, probably hear the news cheerfully. If they sighed at all, it was a sigh of relief."

Between 2005 and 2008 this issue was compounded by the discovery that key elements of Martin Allen's Hidden Agenda trilogy were based on twenty-nine forged documents which had been placed in the UK National Archives. These forged papers, which seem to have been inserted in the archives between 2000 and 2005, explicitly implicated Bedaux high in the elite echelons of the Third Reich. As part of the police investigation into the presence of the documents, Allen denied knowledge of the forgeries and 'suggested he was the victim of a conspiracy'.

== Archives ==
There is a Charles Eugène Bedaux fonds at Library and Archives Canada. Archival reference number is R7591.
