= Clementhorpe =

Suburb and former village in York, England

Coordinates: 53.9525°N 1.0823°W

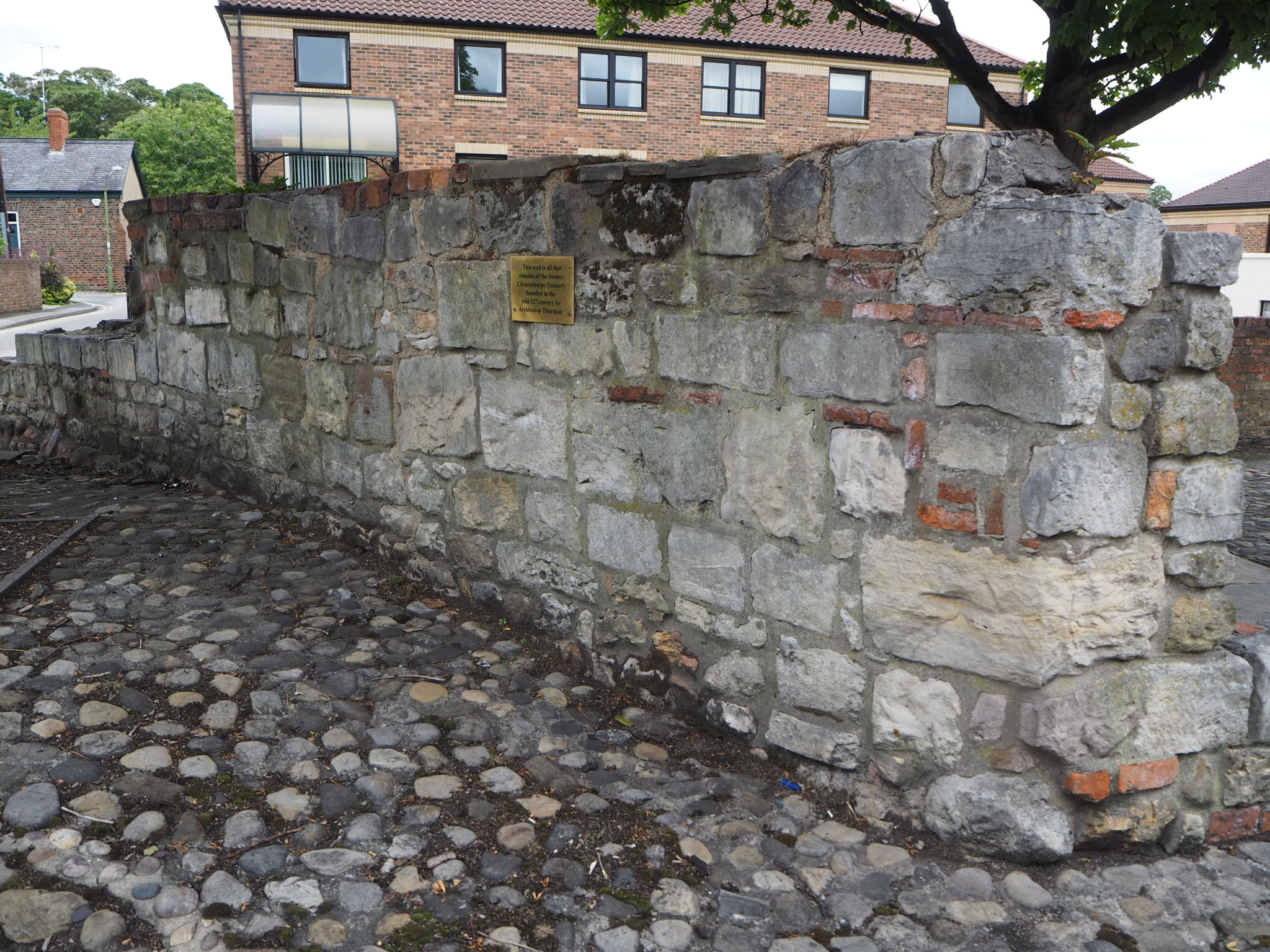
- Part of the wall from St Clement Nunnery, which was found to be repositioned after archaeological digs in the 1970s

- Location within North Yorkshire
- OS grid reference: SE602511
- Unitary authority: York
- Ceremonial county: North Yorkshire
- Region: Yorkshire and the Humber
- Country: England
- Sovereign state: United Kingdom
- Post town: York
- Postcode district: YO23 1
- Dialling code: 01904
- Police: North Yorkshire
- Fire: North Yorkshire
- Ambulance: Yorkshire
- UK Parliament: York Central

Clementhorpe is a suburb, that was formerly a hamlet, parish and village in the city of York, in the ceremonial county of North Yorkshire, England. Initially occupied by the Romans, at around 1130 St. Clements Nunnery, a Benedictine priory was founded, but was later dissolved by Henry VIII in 1536. At the start of the 19th century, very little of the village remained, however the area became part of the ever growing residential areas of the city, with industry moving in along the River Ouse. Clementhorpe's most famous business was the confectioner Terry's. In 2013 it was voted 9th in The Times most coolest places to live in the United Kingdom.

== Toponym ==
Early historians had originally thought the name came from the Nunnery founded on the site. However, the use of thorpe in its name refers to the toponym that the Danes had settled a secondary settlement, either a hamlet or farm, that depended on the larger place. The clement in the name is believed to be in reference to St. Clement, a popular saint amongst Scandinavian settlers in the 10th and 11th centuries, for which a church of this name is believed to have existed. The first record in written text of Clementhorpe was in 1080, which was prior to the foundation of the nunnery.

== Geography ==
The boundaries of Clementhorpe were originally marked by the ancient parish: To the north, the ancient walls of the city of York marked the boundary, while to the east lay the River Ouse. To the west lay Knavesmire, while Bishopthorpe lay to the south. Today the southern and western boundary is marked by South Bank and Scarcroft allotments (formerly part of Micklegate Stray).

== History ==
=== Early history ===
In the 2nd century AD, Romans artificially terraced the west banks of the River Ouse. Evidence of occupation was found in 1976-77, with a series of multi roomed structures, one with a mosaic floor dated from the 3rd or 4th century AD. There was only ephemeral evidence of post-Roman occupation, with a pebble floor and post holes found. However, a large stone foundation was built on top of part of the Roman structures, which has been speculated as being the original church of St Clement that pre-dated the nunnery.

Clementhorpe first written record was in 1080. In the Magnum Registrum Album of York, the Archbishop of York asked the King what lands he did control, which the response was "amongst his privileges and legal titles, which Archbishop T. possesses through all York, within and without the city" is mentioned "all of Clementhorpe". Clementhorpe did not feature in the Domesday Book, but further mention of the settlement was recorded in 1106 by commissioners of Henry I, which stated "all the toll in Clementesthorp from all the ships which touch there shall be the archbishop’s, and below Clementesthorpe as far as the archbishop’s land stretches; and the whole custom of fish shall be the archbishop’s from both sides of the water".

Archbishop Thurstan established St. Clements Nunnery, a Benedictine priory, by foundation charter. The exact date of its foundation is unclear, and it is widely reported as around 1130. It was the first religious house for women in Yorkshire founded post-conquest, and the only one in the vicinity of the city of York. The nunnery church was shared with Clementhorpe parishioners. The village was substantial, with many of the inhabitants working in small scale farming and industries, probably helped by the presence of the nunnery.

=== Medieval to 18th century ===
In 1405, Archbishop of York, Richard Le Scrope was executed at Clementhorpe due to his involvement in the Northern Rising. A chapel containing a shrine with his head was built in Clementhorpe shortly afterwards. By this time, the population in the parish had dropped, and for taxation purposes Clementhorpe was grouped with St Mary Bishophill Senior from the 14th century. In 1427 the valuation of the parish was 20s (shillings), but by 1446 it only paid 6s 7d for a special levy in regards to a litigation against St. Marys Abbey.

At the dissolution of the monasteries under Henry VIII in 1536, the King's commissioners reported there was only two houses. The church was not used after the dissolution, and by 1548 the mayor of York offered the site for sale. The ecclesiastical side of the parish was finally merged with St Mary's, Bishop Hill Senior in 1586. With the closure of the nunnery, the area slowly went into decline. An archaeological dig in 1976 found that lime kilns had been built in the area, with one of the kilns having an inscribed Roman dedication slab within its construction. An etching by Edmond Barker from 1718 shows that boat building was happening in the area.

=== 19th century ===
The area started to be developed with housing with small scale development in 1823. A year later, Henry Richardson & Company set up a fertiliser works. The suburb grew from the River Ouse to the East, along Nunnery Lane to the West, and a subway was built under the city's walls so parishioners could get to the church in Bishophill. To assist with local boat building, the Ouse Navigation Trustees built a slipway in 1836. Further businesses moved in, with Terry's opening their new factory in 1864, while a carriage and wagon works opened in 1867, and York Confectionery Co. established a factory between 1870 to 1880. A new day school for boys, girls and infants opened in Cherry Street in 1872, which had to be extended in 1877. Between 1872 and 1874, a new St Clement's Church, York was built on Scarcroft Road. In 1875, the large glassworks of St Clements glass opened. By 1876, Clementhorpe had become an ecclesiastical parish again, and included the newly developed estates in South Bank. Further industry arrived with a Maltings opening between 1880 and 1889, while the York Equitable Industrial Society opened a new central premises with a coal wharf at the former glass works at a cost of £1,600 in 1899. In Seebohm Rowntree's 1901 Poverty, A Study of Town Life, Clementhorpe was identified as an area "inhabited by the working classes, but comprising a few houses where servants are kept". The report didn't mention the conditions people were living in, however, only a few years before in 1884, The Yorkshire Post reported that the City Council’s Medical Officer of Health detailed the insanitary conditions that had led to outbreaks of typhoid fever.

=== 20th century onwards ===
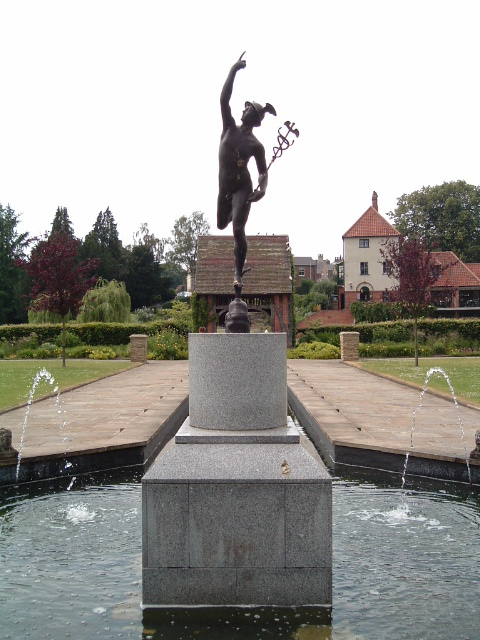
A statue in Rowntree park, with the dovecote and Rowntree Lodge visible in the background.

During World War I, Upper Price Street was hit by a bomb during a Zepplin raid in May 1916. In 1921, Rowntree Park was opened as a memorial to Rowntree workers whose lives were lost during World War I. The park's lake was formed by diverting the Clementhorpe Beck, a stream that runs into the River Ouse. Due to the increasing population in the parish, St Chad's Church was opened in South Bank in 1926, and two years later became an ecclesiastical parish in its own right. In 1930, the Leeds Mercury reported that the city Council had announced that they were going to fill in the old slipway.

Prior to the start of World War II, air shelters were built in the cellar of Terry's Clementhorpe building which could host 170, while two further shelters were built along Bishopthorpe Road. The government during the war encouraged people to stay at home and have ‘holidays at home’, and Rowntree Park became a focal point for the community and hosted concert parties, dances, talent spotting competitions, sheepdog shows, donkey rides, puppet shows. In 1955, Rowntree paid for a pair of gates as a World War II memorial to lost staff members located on Terry Avenue.

The area remained industrialised after the war, but in a City Council planning report from 1975 showed that the industry had started to de-industrislise, with both Hargreaves and Terry's having closed, and unemployment in the area double the York average. The report stated The major unsightly sites in the area are the derelict residential properties on Cherry Street (soon to be demolished), the cleared land in Hargreaves site used for storage and car parking, the vacant Terry’s land, the cleared site of the former warehouse south of Fenwick Street and William Street, and the site of garages and demolished buildings off Lovell Street. The plan envisaged the retention of commercial buildings along the River frontage, but the remaining areas would be for residential property. At the time a new inner ring road was planned to cross the River, continuing the along line of Scarcroft Road. However, only three years later the plan was to remove all industry from Clementhorpe and to replace with residential properties Housing in the area was improved during this period, with a Housing Action Area being raised in 1976, while a General Improvement Area was set by the government in 1981. One of these developments, Clementhorpe Court by the Joseph Rowntree Housing Trust was part of a court case regarding the management of the leases by a charity in 1982.

By 2011, all of the heavy industry had left Clementhorpe, and the land had mostly been redeveloped as residential. The former Hargreaves and Terry's site had made way for the Postern development, while the old Co-operative site, with part of the site now home to Waterside House and Duke’s Wharf. The remaining businesses being retail, restaurants and hairdressers, solicitors and property agents all based along Bishopgate Street and Bishopthorpe Road.

== Governance ==
Clementhorpe is part of the parliamentary constituency of York Central, with the current MP being Rachael Maskell who has held the seat since 2015.

Locally, the suburb has been served by the City of York Council, a Unitary authority, since 2015 and is in the ward of Micklegate, where they are represented by 3 councillors. Since 2024, the suburb has come under the York and North Yorkshire Combined Authority, with the sitting Mayor of York and North Yorkshire being David Skaith.

== Demographics ==
At the 2021–2022 United Kingdom censuses, the ward of Micklegate, which Clementhorpe is part of, recorded a population of 12,405. The ward had a higher percentage of people from black and ethnic minority communities than York in general (7.8% against 7.3%), but had a lower rate of working age people claiming Universal credit than the overall city.

== Historical buildings ==
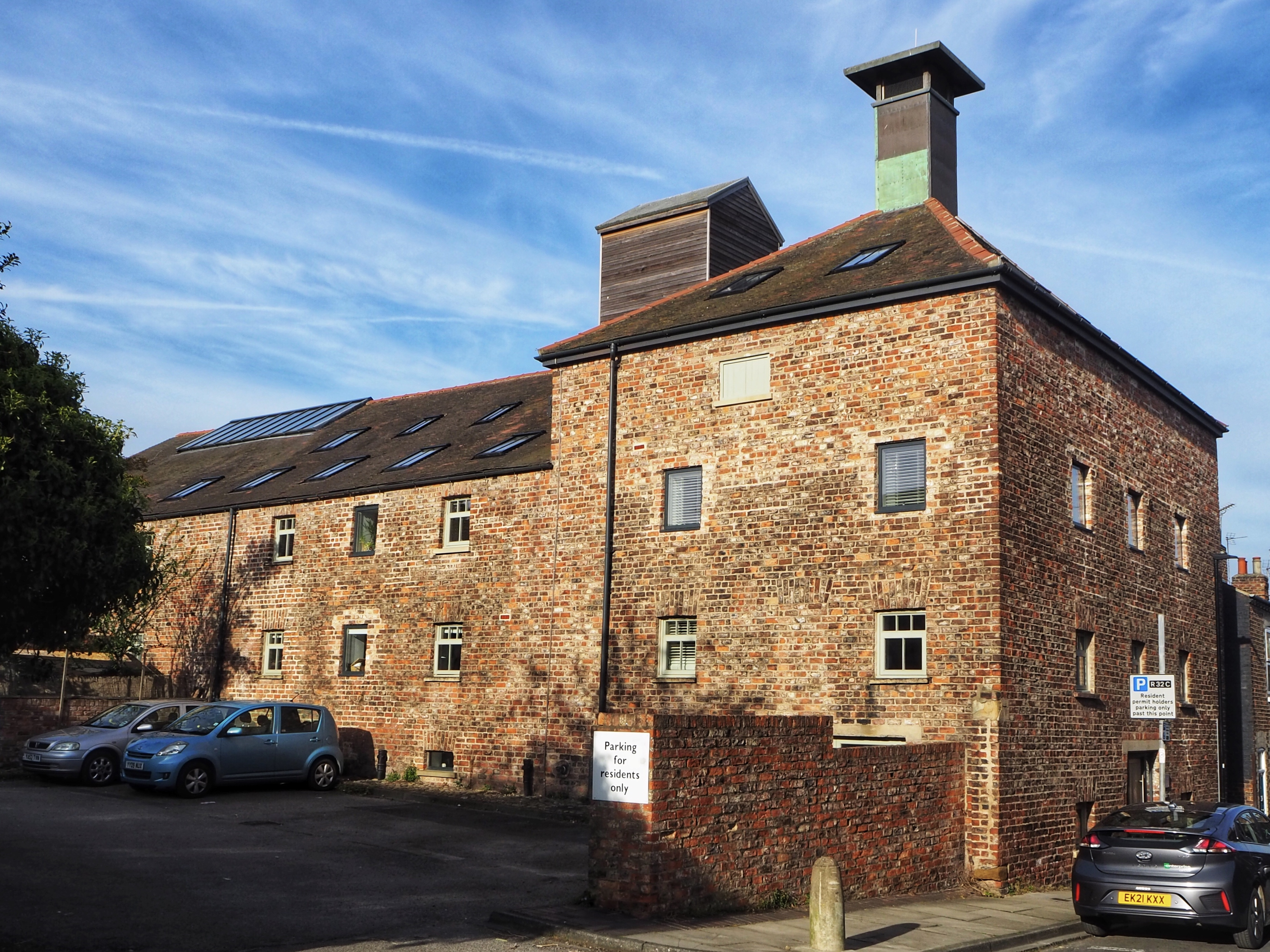
Clementhorpe Maltings

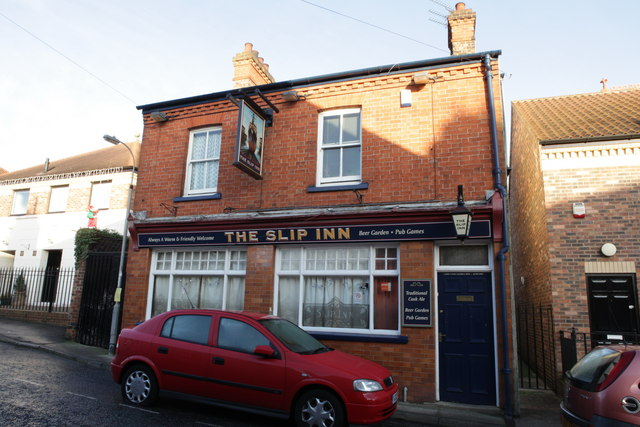
The Slip Inn

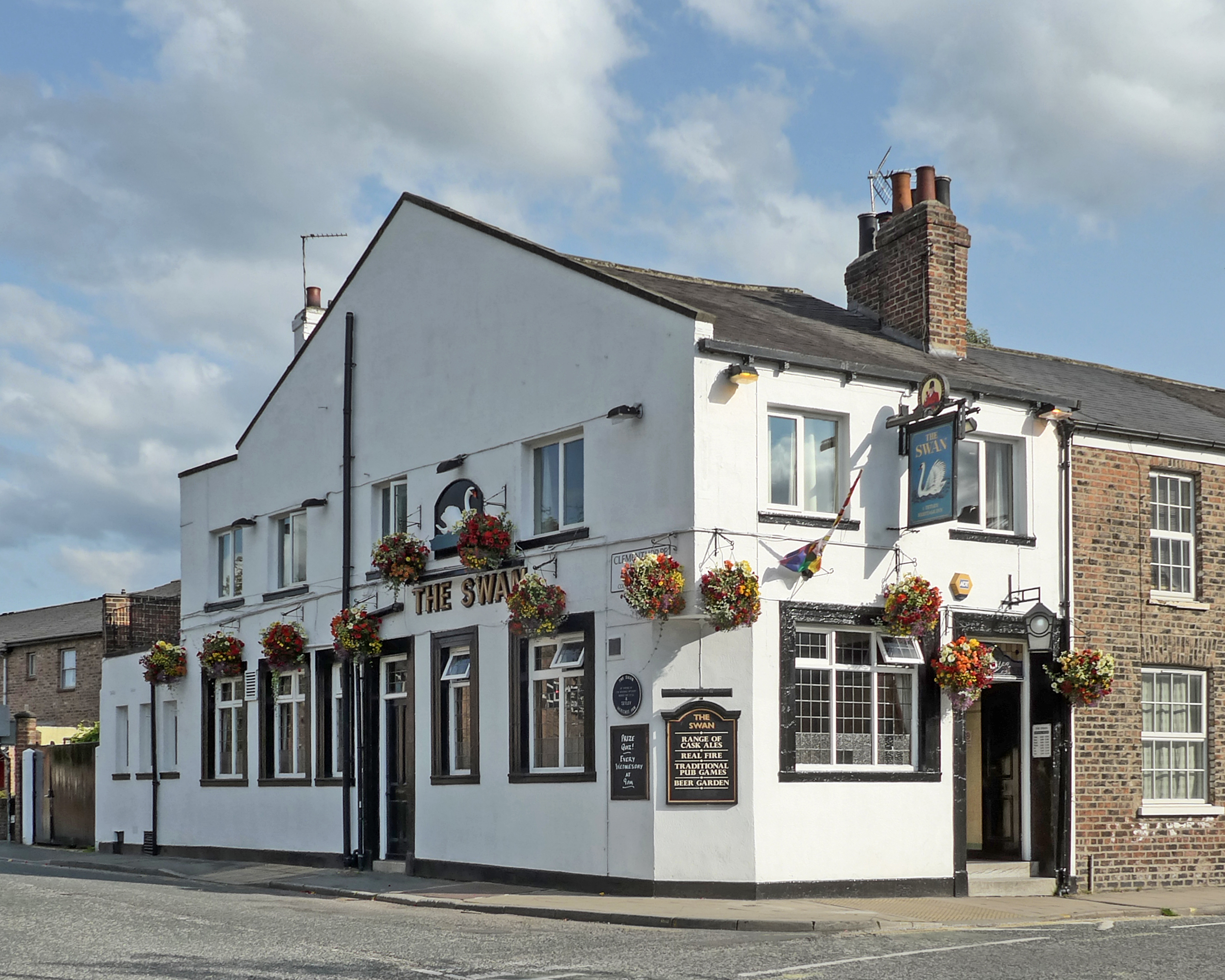
The Swan in 2015

Clementhorpe has several Historic buildings. Clementhorpe Maltings was built between 1880 and 1889, by the Tadcaster Tower Brewery Company Ltd, and in the early 20th century it was altered when an H. J. H. King furnace was added. The maltings were used up to the late 1950s, but after its closure it was used by local museums as storage. The building was listed as Grade II in 2001. In 2015, local residents tried but failed to get the building listed as an asset of community value, and permission was given to convert the building to residential use. The conversion was completed in 2017, with artefacts, including a double-bucket elevator, a large grain hopper, a grain-dressing machine, a cast iron steep and the kiln furnace for curing the malt restored and displayed at the property’s communal entrance. The development won a RICS Awards for the Yorkshire and Humber area in 2017.

The Swan public house is on Bishopgate Street. The building was recorded as being a public house since 1861, and was acquired by brewers Joshua Tetley & Son in 1899. In 1936, the building was refurbished to designs by the architects' practice, Kitson, Parish, Ledgard & Pyman. In 2010 the property was nationally listed at Grade II.

The Slip Inn is the last remaining evidence of the old boat building industry in Clementhorpe. The inn was built in 1836, and was recorded in Hugh Murray’s book Directory of York Pubs of 1843. It is recognised as a local heritage site by City of York Council and was CAMRA’s York Pub of the Year in 2020.

== Clementhorpe Nunnery ==
St. Clements Priory, commonly known as Clementhorpe Nunnery, was founded as a Benedictine order in around 1130 by Archbishop Thurston. In addition to the nunnery site, the priory was endowed two carucates of land within an unspecified area of the city, rent of 20 shillings per annum from the archbishop, 6 acres of land in Southwell to build a guest house and rents and tithes from the archbishop’s mills and two acres of land inside and outside York. Further lands in Otley and Cawood were acquired as well as rents and tithes in Bishop Monkton and Bishop Wilton. In the final years of his pontificate, Archbishop Thurston tried to appoint a prioress, with his preferred candidate being the famous 12th century recluse, Christina of Markyate, but she chose St Albans. During 1192, Archbishop Geoffrey, half brother of Richard I, granted the priory to the abbey of Godstow. However, the prioress, Alice, travelled to Rome to appeal the decision with the Pope. The archbishop excommunicated the nuns, but with a papal decision in their favour, they regained their independence.

The day to day activities of the nunnery were generally unrecorded, however, there are records of some history and incidents at St. Clements. Many of the prioress' at the nunnery had served as nuns at St. Clement, including Margaret Carr, Margaret Frankelayne and Isabel Ward, while at least three had left the nunnery to take up prioress positions elsewhere. In 1300, men arrived at the gate and one of the nuns, Cecil, throw off her robes and went off with them on horseback. Thirteen years later, Archbishop Greenfield had to set up a commission to intervene at the nunnery, as a priest, John, son of Ralph the Hosier of York, was charged for the crimes of incontinence and incest with a Clementhorpe nun, Alice of Leeds. The nunnery on several occasions was financially in trouble. Archbishop Melton in 1317 is recorded as saying the insolvency of Clementhorpe, while in the 15th century, both Pope Eugene IV and the bishop of Bangor gave money for repairs to the nunnery.

On 28 February 1536, Drs Layton and Legh visited the nunnery as part of Henry VIII plan to dissolve the monastery, which passed as law in March. The law permitted the dissolution of any religious house that had an annual income of less than £200, and Layton and Legh recorded that the nunnery was only earning £50 per annum. By the 13 July, the nunnery had been dissolved and the site was leased to William Maunsell, the clerk of York castle and of the Yorkshire county court.
