= Secondary poverty =

Poverty caused by non-essential spending

Secondary poverty is a description of poverty referring to those living below the poverty line whose income was sufficient for them to live above the line, but was spent on things other than the necessities of life.

In 18th and 19th century Great Britain, the practice of temperance among Methodists, as well as their rejection of gambling, allowed them to eliminate secondary poverty and accumulate capital.

The term was coined by Seebohm Rowntree after his investigations into poverty in York.

== Factors contributing to secondary poverty ==
=== Alcohol use ===
The Bureau of Labor Statistics found that "the average American consumer dedicates 1 percent of all their spending to alcohol".

In Scotland, households spent an average of £8.90 a week on alcohol.

=== Gambling ===
In the United States, the average individual loses $400.00 to gambling each year.

The British National Anti-Gambling League, which was founded in 1890, condemned the lottery as a cause of secondary poverty. More recently, the sociologist Gerda Reith stated that the lottery exploited working classes, which see it as one of the sole avenues for liberation from oppression. Reith stated that governments use the lottery as a means to increase their revenue and called it an "extra form of taxation".

Indeed, people in the low-income brackets (2.8%) spend a higher percentage of their household income on games of chance than people in higher income brackets (0.5%). That is important since the risk of gambling related harm increases significantly when more than 1% of gross family income is spent on gambling activities. The additional risk of gambling for those in a lower-income bracket warrants further attention with the expansion of government-operated gambling throughout Canada, especially since increased rates of problem gambling prevalence are linked to enhanced accessibility and availability. Problem gambling can be defined as difficulties in limiting money and/or time spent on the activity, which leads to problems for the gambler and others. According to Hahmann and Matheson (n.d.), two life events can lead to homelessness: significant job loss and problem gambling.

=== Tobacco ===
In India, smokers spend ₹36,000 annually on smoking cigarettes.

=== Other drugs ===
"A survey from 2007 notes that 23% of unemployed persons had used cocaine at least once.", although homelessness may contribute to the use of cocaine, rather than the other way around.

== See also ==
- Poverty
