= Standard data system =

In work measurement, a standard data system (SDS) is a database of normal time values, usually organized by work elements that can be used to establish time standards for tasks composed of work elements similar to those in the database.

== Steps in using an SDS ==
1. Analyze the new task and divide into work elements.
2. Access database to determine normal times for work elements.
3. Add element normal times to obtain task normal time.
4. Compute standard times.
