= Ad Hoc Committee on Slavery =

Committee of the United Nations

The Ad Hoc Committee on Slavery was a committee of the United Nations (UN), created in 1950. It investigated the occurrence of slavery on a global level. Its final report resulted in the introduction of the Supplementary Convention on the Abolition of Slavery of 1956.

It was the first anti-slavery committee of the UN. It was in fact a continuation of the work started by the Advisory Committee of Experts on Slavery before the World War II, a campaign which could continue after the end of the war. The committee's investigation took place during a period of time when chattel slavery was still legal only in the Arabian Peninsula, and resulted in the final ban on chattel slavery in the last region when it was legal only a few years after.

== History ==
The global investigation of the occurrence of slavery and slave trade performed by the Advisory Committee of Experts on Slavery (ACE) between 1934 and 1939, was interrupted by the outbreak of the World War II, but it lay the foundation for the work against slavery performed by the UN after the war.

When the League of Nations was succeeded by the United Nations (UN) after the end of the World War II, Charles Wilton Wood Greenidge of the Anti-Slavery International conducted a three years long campaign for the UN to continue the investigation of global slavery conducted by the ACE of the League.

In 1948, the United Nations declared slavery to be a crime against humanity in the Universal Declaration of Human Rights, after which the Anti-Slavery Society pointed out that there were about one million slaves in the Arabian Peninsula, which was a crime against the 1926 Slavery Convention, and demanded that the UN form a committee to handle the issue.

The Anti-Slavery Society was given consultative status in the ECOSOC of the UN in 1949, and campaigned against contemporary slavery such as the mui tsai. After three years, Greenidge's campaign met success in 1949, when the UN formed their ad hoc Committee on Slavery. The committee was formally inaugurated with its first meeting at Lake Success, which lasted between February and March 1950.

The Ad Hoc Committee on Slavery was to "survey the field of slavery and other institutions of customs resembling slavery" for a period of twelve months. It was composed of five experts, among them Charles Wilton Wood Greenidge, Jane Vialle, Professor Pablo Troncoso of Chile and Professor Bruno Lasker of Germany. There were some uncertainty whether slavery should include only actual chattel slavery or also force labor.

The committee was to consider the "nature and extent" of slavery and force labor, and suggest "methods of attacking" them.

The committee issued a questionnaire listing a number of different practices, both practices defined as slavery according to the 1926 Slavery Convention, but also added new practices, and among those listed were chattel slavery, serfdom, peonage, debt-bondage, pawning, exploitation of children by false adoption such as mui tsai, forced marriage, and forced labor; they asked governments as well as NGOs such as the World Federation of Trade Unions and the American Workers Defense League, if they were aware of these practices occurred and which measures had been taken to combat them.

At the time of the Ad Hoc Committee on Slavery, legal chattel slavery still existed only in the Arabian Peninsula: in Oman, in Qatar, in Saudi Arabia, in the Trucial States and in Yemen. Chattel slavery was officially banned in the rest of the world. However, chattel slavery still existed de facto despite the formal law in several parts of Africa.

Saudi Arabia and Yemen, where legal chattel slavery still existed, refused to participate in the survey. The British admitted that slavery were still legal in the Aden Protectorate, but avoided sending in information about slavery in the Trucial States. The British did not send in any information about slavery in Sudan.

There were suggestions to create a new convention to expand the definition of slavery, to include not only chattel slavery, such as in the 1926 Slavery Convention, but also to forbid debt bondage, serfdom, forced marriage, adoption aimed at exploitation; that marriages should be registered that slave trading at sea be defined as piracy; that all signatories send annual reports, and to create a permanent committee.

=== Legacy ===
The Committee filed its final report to the ECOSOC in 1951, and it was published in 1953. The report lay the ground work for the creation of a new anti slavery convention known as the Supplementary Convention on the Abolition of Slavery, which was presented in 1954 and introduced in 1956.

Many governments merely described the formal law and avoided and addressing the actual practice of slavery, and ECOSOC therefore asked for a new report. When the 1953 report did not show any difference from the 1951 report, Greenidge forced the issue and sent a draft of a new convention to the ECOSOC in April 1954, which was formally presented by Hans Engen of Norway as rapporteur at the 19th Session of ECOSOC. The suggested convention was not accepted in full; for example, the suggestion to ban mutilations could not be included out of consideration for Muslim countries, were mutilation of hand and foot were a punishment for crime in accordance with Islamic law.

In the 1950s, in connection to the Ad Hoc Committee on Slavery and the Supplementary Convention on the Abolition of Slavery, Barnett Janner described Saudi Arabia and Yemen as the only remaining states were slavery was still a legal institution:

The shipping of slaves occurs in only one particular area of the world, in the seas around Arabia. The warships most likely to search such slavers would be British, and I feel sure that there would not be any abuse of the right to search. I am sorry that we gave up the fight for that right. As far as I know, Saudi Arabia and Yemen are the only States in the world where chattel slavery is still a legal institution. Only a year or so ago a French Deputy—the person, I assume, to whom my hon. Friend referred—investigated the situation and found that every year ignorant Africans are lured on by agents to make a pilgrimage to Mecca. They are not told, of course, that they need a Saudi Arabian visa. When they arrive in Saudi Arabia without a visa they are arrested and put into prison for a few days and then handed over to licensed slave dealers. In addition, raids are made in Baluchistan and the Sheikdoms of the Persian Gulf and people are captured and carried off by land and sea, taken to small Saudi Arabian ports and sold in slave markets.

Legal chattel slavery was finally abolished in the Arabian Peninsula in the 1960s: Saudi Arabia and Yemen in 1962, Dubai in 1963 and Oman in 1970.

== See also ==
- Brussels Anti-Slavery Conference 1889–90, 1889
- Temporary Slavery Commission, 1924
- Committee of Experts on Slavery, 1932
- Advisory Committee of Experts on Slavery, 1933
