= Grove School (Connecticut) =

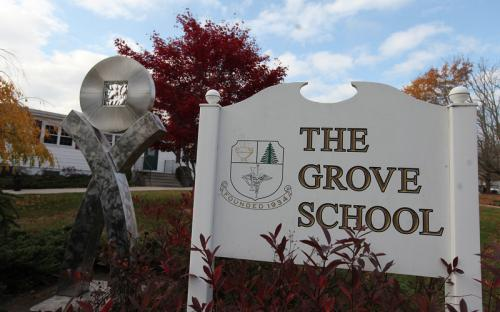

Location
- 175 Copse Road; Madison, Connecticut 06443; United States

Information
- Type: Private, therapeutic boarding and day school
- Established: 1934
- Founder: Jess Perlman
- NCES School ID: 00232858
- President: Richard Chorney
- Director: Peter Chorney
- Principal: Sean Kursawe
- Teaching staff: 31.8 (on an FTE basis)
- Grades: 7–12
- Gender: Co-educational
- Enrollment: 123 (2017-2018)
- Student to teacher ratio: 3.9
- Campus size: 90 acres (36 ha)
- Accreditation: New England Association of Schools and Colleges
- Website: www.groveschool.org

Grove School is a private, co-educational, therapeutic boarding and day school in Madison, Connecticut, United States. It was established in 1934 by Jess Perlman and utilizes a year-round, trimester calendar, with four two-week breaks.

== History ==
Grove was founded as a boys’ school in 1934 by Jess Perlman (earlier, a co-founder of the Baltimore Labor College), who led the school until 1956. From 1956 to 1986, Jack Sanford Davis served as executive director. In 1986, Richard Chorney purchased Grove, converted it into a for-profit propriety corporation with a board of directors, and appointed his son Peter J. Chorney as executive director and president and CEO. In the fall of 1991, Grove School became coeducational.

== Campus ==
Grove School is situated on a 90-acre (36 ha) campus, directly adjacent to the I-95 highway. The dormitories include White House, Middle House, Tessler, Olshin, Lodge, Perlman, Redlich, Patch, Charles, Emmerich, Blue House, Red House, and Yellow House. Grove has constructed many new buildings in the past five years. In 2010, the Alice Chorney Education Center, with nine classrooms, a science lab, a conference room, and a media center. In 2011, an office was built for the administrators-on-duty (AODs) during the day. In 2012, the Robert A. J. Ranieri III Athletics and Recreation Center was completed. In 2015, construction was finished on two new dormitories, the Tessler–Olshin duplex. In January 2016, a new dining hall was opened, with office space for therapists that opened separately in September.

== Faculty ==
Members of the employee community include teachers, faculty advisors, psychiatrists, therapists, spiritual advisors, and nurses, in addition to administrative and maintenance staff, a business office, care staff, and many others. An advisor, therapist, psychiatrist, and academic case manager comprise a treatment team, which maintains close contact with a student's family and school district, if applicable. Most faculty work full-time and many teachers are dorm counselors. Many are recruited from local teaching colleges. Special education teachers also work as academic case managers and advisors, who are assigned to about five students, double as administrators-on-duty or directors. Psychiatrists may also work as therapists and many of the clinicians maintain private practices aside from Grove.

== Co-curricular activities ==
The school's program in the performing arts has frequent student productions. Students may also choose to participate in a variety of varsity and junior varsity athletic teams. After the school day and on weekends, there are a range of recreational activities on and off campus. Student-run clubs meet weekly under the direction of a faculty adviser. Grove has a chapter of the National Honor Society.
