= Baltimore Labor College =

- Baltimore, Maryland; United States

Information
- Type: workers' education
- Opened: c. 1919
- Closed: c. 1931
- Principal: William Ross (president)
- Faculty: Broadus Mitchell, V.F. Calverton

The Baltimore Labor College (c. 1919 – c. 1931) of Baltimore, Maryland, was an early 20th-century college, school, and enterprise for workers' education within the State of Maryland. Its president was Polish-born ILGWU organizer William Ross (b. 1899).

== History ==
The Baltimore Labor College was an outgrowth of the Education Department of the Baltimore Federation of Labor (founded in 1883) and started as Adult Education. In 1919, one of the college's founders was Jess Perlman, director of the Jewish Educational Alliance in Baltimore and executive director of the Federation of Jewish Philanthropies' School for Social Service in Montreal, later a co-founder of the Grove School (Connecticut).

The Amalgamated Clothing Workers of America (ACW) sponsored the Baltimore Labor College as well as Brookwood Labor College, the Rochester Labor College, and the Workers University of Cleveland.

=== 1920s ===
In 1920, the Baltimore Labor College had professors from Johns Hopkins University lecture to its worker students.

In 1921, A.K. Moran, a delegate of the Baltimore Labor College, asked the Workers Education Bureau of America whether a local Philadelphia union could affiliate directly with the Bureau as well as with the Philadelphia Labor College.

In 1924, the Baltimore Labor College joined a US delegation to the UK to visit the British Trades Union Congress (TUC) and Ruskin College. Other delegates came from the Workers Education Bureau, the International Ladies Garment Workers Union (ILGWU), Washington Trade Union College, the Rand School of Social Science, Brookwood Labor College, and the National Women's Trade Union League (WTUL).

In 1929, the Baltimore Labor College reviewed open labor forums along with the Denver Labor College, the New Haven Trades Council, and the Detroit Federation of Labor.

=== 1930s ===
In 1930, the Baltimore Labor College endorsed labor legislation along with other organizations including the American Federation of Labor.

According to a 1931 report, "control of the Baltimore Labor College rests in a board of trustees, which in turn, is elected by a board of control, composed of delegates of the Baltimore Federation of Labor."

In a 1980 oral history interview, William Ross stated:

One of the things I was involved with was the establishment of the Baltimore Labor College. It wasn't a college in the full sense – we just used that name. It consisted of classes for adults and sociological and historical subjects. We also developed a radio labor program, probably the first such program in the country. That was before television. And that was successful. It was paid for by an important New York firm... In addition to it I had to develop a cooperative program with Johns Hopkins University – its economics department. And the program was a joint organization of a number of seminars of very large size. Weekend seminars which would have people of national importance dealing with current labor and industry problems, such as the future of the railroad industry... I... wanted to do more things and I became interested in getting to learn more about the European labor movement and especially I wanted to attend the college known as Ruskin College in Oxford... And the people who were running the Brookwood Labor College arranged for me to go to Ruskin and to Oxford. Of course, the town of Baltimore became very thrilled and excited... My stay in Baltimore off and on was stretched over a five-year period.

== Teachers ==
Teachers included Broadus Mitchell and V.F. Calverton.

== See also ==
- Baltimore Federation of Labor
- Amalgamated Clothing Workers of America
- Brookwood Labor College
- Bryn Mawr Summer School for Women Workers in Industry

== External sources ==
- William Ross Oral History, May 20, 1980
- Workers' Education and Adult Education
