= Poverty, A Study of Town Life =

1901 book by Seebohm Rowntree

Poverty: A Study of Town Life
- Author: B. Seebohm Rowntree
- Genre: Sociology
- Publisher: Macmillan and Co.
- Publication date: 1901
- Media type: Print (hardback and paperback)
- Pages: 437
- ISBN: 1-86134-202-0
- OCLC: 318236487

Poverty, A Study of Town Life is the first book by Seebohm Rowntree, a sociological researcher, social reformer and industrialist, published in 1901. The study, widely considered a seminal work of sociology, details Rowntree's investigation of poverty in York, England and the subsequent implications that arise from the findings, in regard to the nature of poverty at the start of the twentieth century. It also marks the first usage of a poverty line in sociological research.

== Findings ==
Rowntree and his assistants conducted the study on over two-thirds of the population of York; around 46,000 people, excluding those individuals who were able to afford to employ a domestic servant. Of the 46,000 people surveyed, the study revealed that 20,000 were living in poverty; defined by falling below a calculated minimum weekly sum of money 'necessary to enable families to secure the necessities of a healthy life'. 28% of York's population were living in the most serious poverty (or absolute poverty), unable to acquire even basic necessities such as food, fuel and clothing. There were discovered to be two chief reasons for such poverty. Firstly, in 25% of the cases, individuals or families were impoverished as a result of an absolute lack of income, on account of the chief wage-earner being either dead, disabled or otherwise unable to work. However, in around 50% of cases, the chief wage-earner was employed in regular work, but paid mere pittance, unable to sustain a healthy level of living. In the remainder of the cases, income was satisfactory to purchase necessities, but the spending of it was often "unwise", or simply unnecessary. Importantly, the study revealed that poverty in Britain was widespread, and not simply confined to the sprawling urban metropolis of London.

== Influence ==
Rowntree's findings proved instrumental in changing public perception of the causes of poverty, and are widely regarded as a significant catalyst in the emergence of the New Liberalism movement, as well as the subsequent Liberal welfare reforms from 1906 to 1914, providing the foundation for the modern-day Welfare State.

The publication had particular influence on the leading liberal and future prime minister, David Lloyd George, primarily as a result of Rowntree's tireless lecture tour across the country, and the media frenzy that surrounded its publication. Another future Prime Minister, Winston Churchill (who famously "crossed the floor" in the House of Commons and sit as Liberal Party member in 1903) was equally influenced by the study. When addressing an audience in Blackpool in 1902, he stated that Rowntree's book had "fairly made [his] hair stand on end", going on to call the revelations of the study in regard to poverty, a "terrible and shocking thing", and subsequently expressing sympathy with "people who have only the workhouse or prison as avenues to change from their present situation."

To many politicians, such as Churchill, rather than simply highlighting the plight of the poor, Rowntree's study prompted further evidence for the necessity to improve National Efficiency; an issue of great contemporary concern for government, fuelling fears in relation to the perceived decline of the British Empire as a world power, at least in relation to other major powers, namely the growing military might of Germany. In addition to this, Churchill concluded from Rowntree's findings that it was quite evident "that the American labourer is a stronger, larger, healthier, better fed, and consequently more efficient animal than a large proportion of our population, and this is surely a fact which our unbridled Imperialists, who have no thought but to pile up armaments, taxation and territory, should not lose sight of." Furthermore, he wrote: "For my own part, I see little glory in an Empire which can rule the waves and is unable to flush its sewers." Contextually, the study was published in 1901 amidst furore over the ongoing Second Boer War, in which Britain, an Imperial power, was seemingly unable to defeat a "far-inferior" Boer force of Calvinistic farmers. During the war, the authorities encountered immense difficulty in actually finding men to fight One in three potential recruits were refused on medical grounds.

== Criticism ==
The publication received some amount of contemporary criticism, predominantly from groups such as the Charity Organisation Society who advocated the principles of self-help and limited government intervention in regard to poverty; which fundamentally indicated that the poor were poor of their own accord. These beliefs, of course, ran counter to the revelations of Rowntree's study, which discovered quite the opposite to be the case. Helen Bosanquet, one of the founders of the Charity Organisation Society, and wife of Bernard Bosanquet, expressed scepticism about the accuracy of the findings, explaining that Rowntree's poverty line represented "no statistical evidence at all", being "merely a summary of impressions." Similarly, Charles Loch, the COS secretary, was particularly scathing, citing the content of the study as "generalisations cloaked in numerical phraseology".
