= Rowntree Park =

Public open space in York, England

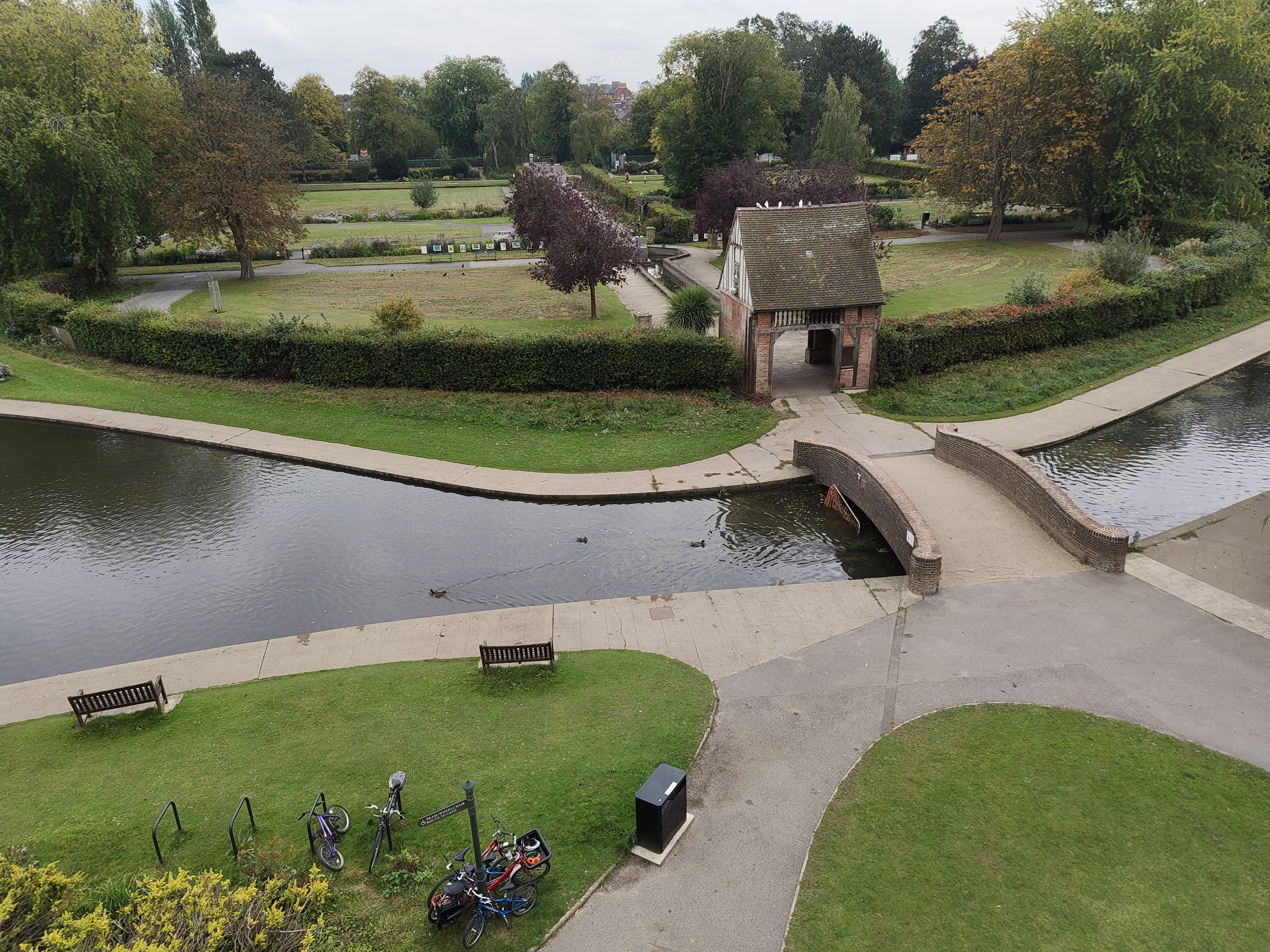
- The lake and lychgate in 2025
- Interactive map of Rowntree Park
- Type: Urban park
- Location: Terry Avenue, Clementhorpe, York, England
- Coordinates: 53°56′50″N 1°04′57″W
- Area: 25 acres (10 ha)
- Created: 16 July 1921; 105 years ago

Rowntree Park is a Grade II-listed public park on Terry Avenue in Clementhorpe, a suburb of York, England. It was created as a memorial to employees of Rowntree's who died in the First World War and was opened on 16 July 1921 by Joseph Rowntree. The park was laid out between 1919 and 1921 and later expanded in 1926–27 and again in 2000, increasing its area to 25 acres (10 ha). Several early features were added during the 1920s, including public swimming baths and an aviary. The riverbank entrance gates, erected in 1954 and believed to have come from Richings Park in Iver, were listed at Grade II* in 1983. Rowntree Park has received a Green Flag Award each year since 2004.

== Facilities ==
The park features children's playgrounds, tennis courts, bowling greens, basketball court, skateboarding area and general areas for picnicking. The park also features a large lake, a canal and a water cascade, and is home to many ducks, swans and Canada geese, as well as a large dovecote. The park's outdoor swimming pool was demolished in the 1980s, despite strong public support for keeping it open. The park is also home to a reading cafe, which is a branch of the York Explore public library. The cafe is located in the Rowntree Park Lodge, which previously also housed the park keeper's house, and a boat house.

== History ==
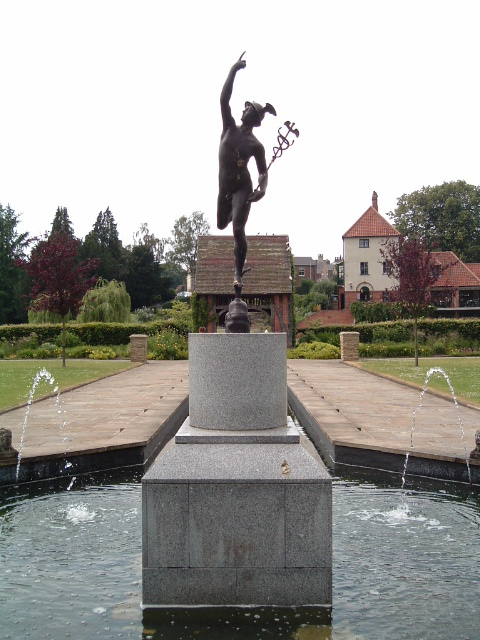
A statue in the park, with the dovecote and Rowntree Lodge visible in the background.

It was created in memory of employees of Rowntree's who died in the First World War, and was opened on 16 July 1921 by the local entrepreneur and philanthropist Joseph Rowntree. When the land was purchased in 1919, the 17 acres (6.9 ha) cost £1,500. The park was originally laid out by Fred Rowntree and W. J. Swain between 1919 and 1921. It now covers 25 acres (10 ha), having been extended in 1926–27 with the purchase of the Clementhorpe allotments, and again in 2000 with the acquisition of Butcher Terrace football fields. Public swimming baths were opened in the park in 1924, and an aviary was added at the Richardson Street entrance in 1929, although it was removed during the 1950s.

The gates at the riverbank entrance were erected in 1954. They are early-18th-century gates believed to have come from Richings Park, Iver and were given by the company as a memorial to the people of York who died in the Second World War. The gates were Grade II* listed in 1983. There are further commemorative plaques on the dovecote.

The park was listed at Grade II by Historic England in 1999. It celebrated its centenary in July 2021 with an open day and a programme of activities.

Each year since 2004, the park has won a Green Flag Award, which is given to sites that meet the national standard for parks and green spaces in England and Wales.

The park was flooded several times by the River Ouse in late 2023 and 2024, which led to its closure until a cleanup operation could be completed. It reopened in March 2024.

In January 2026, children were reported to have been seen on the frozen lake. A month later, water-filled holes were reported as posing a danger to children. The council installed safety barriers around the holes, but was criticised by local residents as excessive, particularly as the holes were adjacent to the un-barriered lake.

== Gallery ==
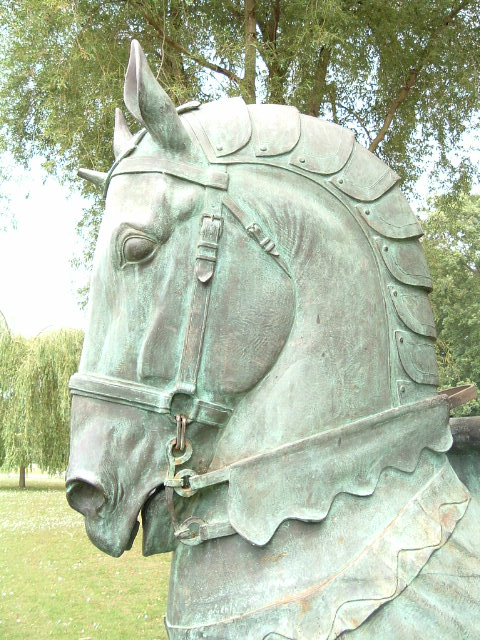
Statue of horse in Rowntree Park

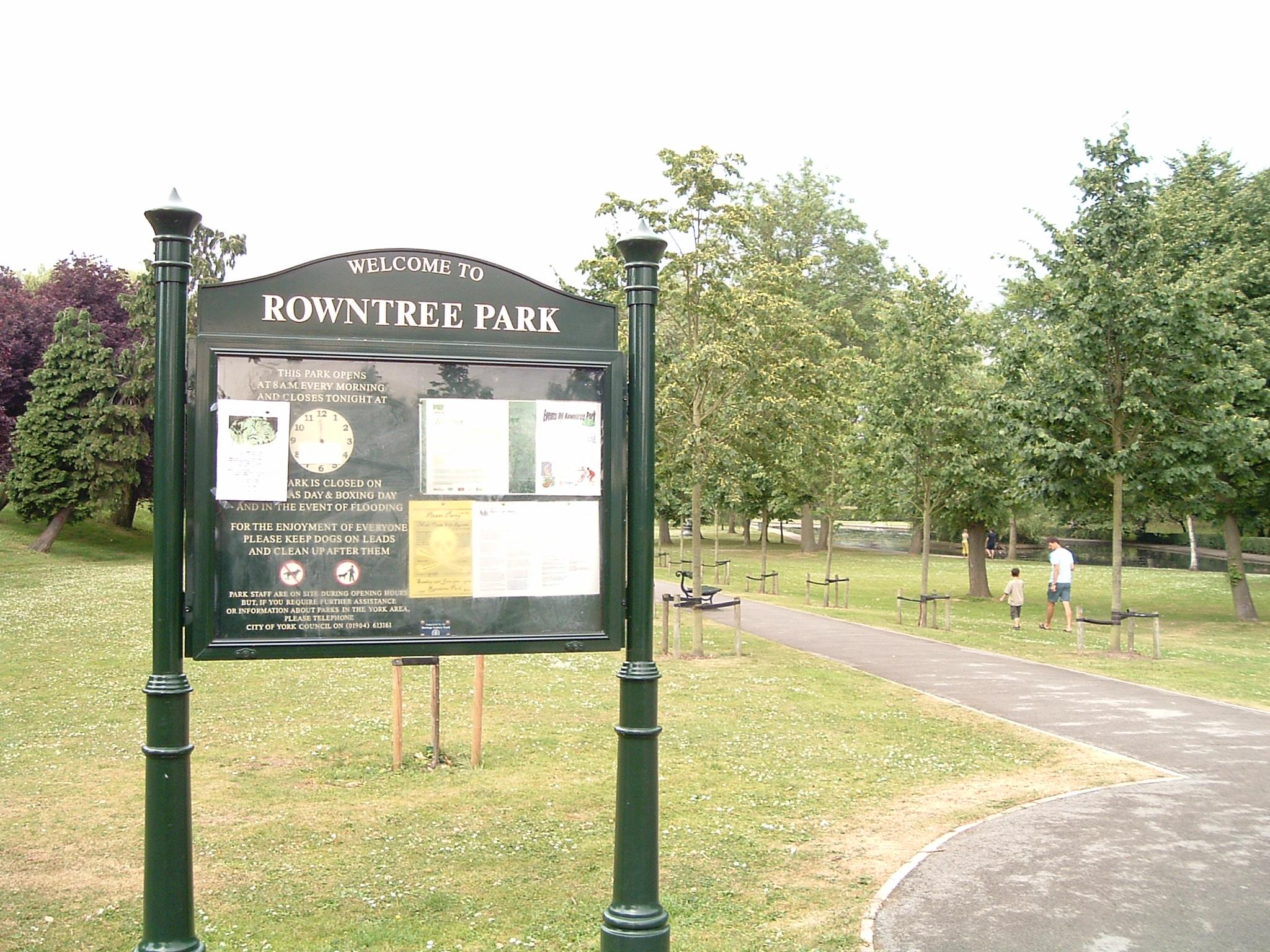
Rowntree Park

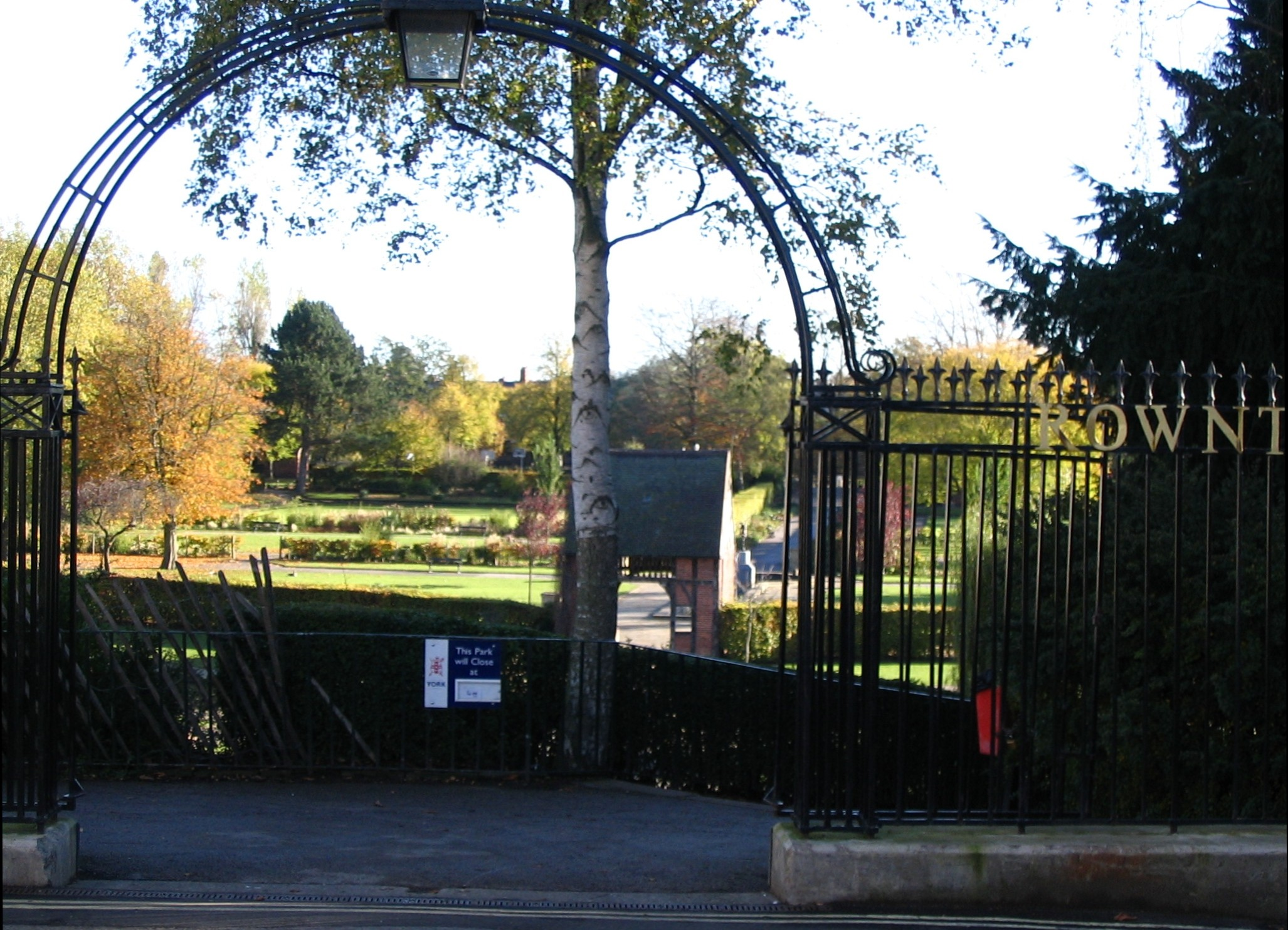
Entrance from South Bank

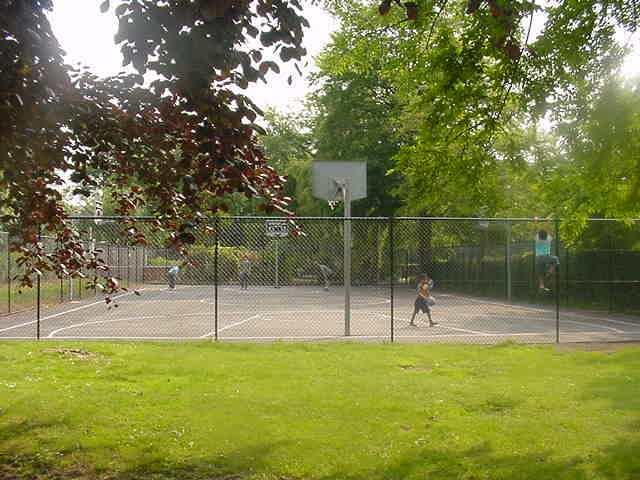
Basketball court

== See also ==
- Grade II* listed buildings in the City of York
