= National Anti-Gambling League =

The National Anti-Gambling League (NAGL) was a British campaigning organization founded in 1890 by F. A. Atkins. Until its demise in the late 1940s, the League was "the leading anti-gambling organization" in the United Kingdom.

The League had three offices in London, Manchester and York. The aims of the NAGL were laid out in its journal, the Bulletin of the National Anti-Gambling League:

Nothing less than the reformation of England as regards the particular vice against which our efforts are aimed... There is humiliation in the thought that the chosen Anglo Saxon race, foremost in the civilisation and government of the world, is first also in the great sin of Gambling.

NAGL Members included John Hawke, J. A. Hobson, Ramsay MacDonald and Seebohm Rowntree.
