= Bruno Lasker =

Writer and social worker

- Born: July 21, 1880; Hamburg, Germany
- Died: September 9, 1965 (aged 85); Kitsap County, Washington
- Occupations: Writer, Social reformer

Bruno Lasker (1880–1965) was a writer and social worker advocating for immigrants in the early twentieth century United States.

== Early life ==
Lasker was born in Hamburg, Germany on July 21 or 26, 1880. He moved to England in 1901 and worked in various social reform movements, particularly with Seebohm Rowntree and The Rowntree Trust, as well as with David Lloyd George.

== Work in the United States ==
In 1914, Lasker immigrated from England to the United States. He lived in New York City and worked at the Henry Street Settlement and on various committees appointed by the mayor. He was associate editor of the Survey Magazine, 1917–1923, and later worked with Survey Graphic. He was also associated with the World War I Inquiry. Lasker took a particular interest in Asian migration and Asian-U.S. relations, traveling extensively for the Institute of Pacific Relations in East Asia and Southeast Asia. He wrote about social, economic, educational, and cultural conditions in the region, as well as relations with the West.

In 1931, Lasker published Filipino Immigration to the Continental United States and to Hawaii, one of the earliest scholarly studies of Filipinos in America. Other publications include:

- Human Bondage in Southeast Asia (Chapel Hill: University of North Carolina Press)
- Jewish Experiences in America (1930)
- Propaganda from China and Japan: A Case Study in Propaganda Analysis
- Educational Progress in Southeast Asia

Lasker recorded an oral history which, like his papers, is housed at Columbia University.

== UN Assignment ==
He was a member of the Ad Hoc Committee on Slavery of the UN in 1950–1951.
