= The Land (study) =

1913 book by Seebohm Rowntree

The two volumes of the report

The Land was the report of the Land Enquiry Committee set up by David Lloyd George. It argued that poverty would be reduced by increasing the number of small landownings which farmers had.

The report investigated land ownership and use, and the condition of workers' housing in Great Britain and made recommendations for its improvement. The committee was chaired by A. H. D. Acland, and included sitting Liberal MPs and the poverty campaigner B. Seebohm Rowntree.

The first volume, on the rural situation, was published in 1913; followed by the urban volume in 1914. The publications were made while the Land Valuation Survey that was incorporated in the "People's Budget" (Finance (1909-1910) Act was taking place.
