= Richard Johnson and Nephew =

Manchester wire drawing business

Richard Johnson and Nephew was a company which had its roots in the purchase of a small Manchester wire drawing business in the early 19th century. Helped by the technical expertise of George Bedson and his grandson Noel, Richard Johnson and Nephew became a leading international steel and copper wire drawing company. In 1973 the firm merged with Thomas Firth & John Brown to form Johnson and Firth Brown.

== History ==
=== The Firm’s Formation ===
The official history of the Company dated its formation to 1773, by James Howard, a pin maker and drawer in Manchester. However, that date appears to be no more than the first time that Howard appears in any records. In 1804, Howard moved to Long Millgate, bought a house and established wire works in basement of school mills. Again, the date is vague but certainly by 1818 John Johnson had acquired what was still a small business. Johnson's father was a silk and cotton maker and his son John had private means. Johnson had as a partner from 1818, Thomas Sharrocks, but it is not known whether he was with Johnson at the start or brought in for financial reasons. The works was moved to Hydes Cross to secure improved river power; the business then specialised in making brass pins. The business prospered in the 1820s and the works was moved again in 1828; it then employed three iron wire drawers and two brass and copper drawers. 1n 1837 John Johnson bought out Sharrocks and handed control to his two sons Richard (born 1809) and William (1811). The firm was then known as Richard Johnson & Brother.

=== The Telegraph Arrives ===
The firm grew rapidly through the 1840s expanding its range to include flour machines and other agricultural products and by 1848 there were 80 employees. What propelled the firm to a different level was the development of the electric telegraph, which required huge quantities of wire. In 1850 the first undersea cable laid across Channel and Richard Johnson provided much of the wire, starting a new era for the firm. Notable contracts in the 1850s included wire for the Niagara Suspension Bridge opened 1855 and 950 tons of wire for the first Transatlantic telegraph cable completed in 1858.

=== George Bedson ===
One of the most significant events in the firm's history was the recruitment in 1850 of George Bedson (1820-1884), a wire drawer who had previously been working for his father. Bedson eventually became responsible for production, making many important technical developments including a system of continuous rolling of wire rods “another of the most valuable improvements in the history of the wire trade”. The management structure that emerged was that Richard planned the policies, William headed sales and Bedson controlled the production. When William died in 1860, Richard offered Bedson a partnership in the firm but he preferred his position and share of profits. Instead, Richard brought in his nephew, Thewlis Johnson (1836–86) only for him to leave shortly after. In 1865, Thewlis returned as a partner, hence the new name of Richard Johnson & Nephew. George Bedson died in 1884, succeeded as general manager by his son Joseph, though less successfully.

=== Move to Bradford Iron Works and Ambergate ===
In 1853 the firm moved much of its production to the Bradford Iron Works, just outside Manchester. The 1860s saw extensive orders from the US for telegraphs and bridges and cable wire for the West Indies and China. The expansion required additional production capacity and in 1873 the firm bought a large property at Ambergate in Derbyshire, opening in 1876. Richard Johnson had virtually retired by 1866 and died in 1881; Thewlis, who had been running the business almost since his partnership, brought in his eldest son Bertie. After Richard's death, Thewlis was the sole owner of the firm and when he died in 1896 aged 59, he left the ownership to his two sons, Bertie and Ernest. Although in the firm they were inexperienced and not helped by downturn in trade; the official history described it as a quiet time for the firm until 1914. The one notable development that did take place in the later years was the firm's entry into the copper trade for the first time, manufacturing copper wire and strip and commutator bars, becoming the second biggest seller of these in the country by 1914.

=== RJN Becomes a Public Company ===
After WWI Manchester was run by Ernest and Ambergate by Bertie. They had to face the post-war recession and substantial redundancies. One strategic move that was made was the cheap purchase of a redundant mill in Austria; this was brought back to Manchester, forming the basis for a copper rolling business. Bertie died in 1923 and with more Johnsons involved in the firm, there was a need to consider its future structure. In 1927, Richard Johnson & Nephew became a public company. The preference shares were offered to the public but the ordinary shares were privately subscribed, though quoted. Ernest Johnson took up the ordinary shares and then made gifts to his children, to senior staff and an employees’ trust. Ernest remained chairman until his death in 1930. For the first time, the family turned to an outsider for chairman, in the person of a retired general, Walker Campbell. His tenure was a period of international recession, low prices and, above all, the wire drawers strike of 1934, otherwise known as the Bedaux strike.

=== The Wire Drawers Strike ===
Charles Bedaux had developed a system of measuring and valuing a worker's output, akin to time and motion study. He was brought in by RJN in 1932 to advise on inefficiencies at the Bradford works. Meetings continued through 1933 until in June 1934, 16 workers were dismissed because they would not accept the recommendations. The following month some 500 men came out on strike (Ambeeley was unaffected). By October new men were being recruited to take the place of those on strike and these had risen to 130 in November with 540 on strike. Eventually the works was fully staffed with new men, and the strike finally collapsed in April 1935; none of the strikers was taken back. A detailed review of the strike, with much documentary evidence, was published by the Communist Party History Group in 1974.

=== Nationalisation Threat ===
By the end of the 1930s, new generations of Johnsons were assuming the senior positions. Walker Campbell retired in 1936, replaced as chairman by Michael Johnson. Robert Johnson joined the Board in 1938 to run Manchester; Ambergate was run by Ian Fairholme. The other important non-family member was Noel Bedson, chief engineer and grandson of George. It was he who had been responsible for bringing the mill from Austria after WWI and who went on to create the first continuous copper rolling mill after WWII. Post-war conditions were acute, with the general austerity, a shortage of raw materials and low output, RJN faced one other challenge: it was on the list of steel companies to be nationalised under the Iron & Steel Act 1949. After a long fight, its name was removed from the Bill as it passed through Parliament. Gradually the business recovered, helped by the new continuous rolling mill – described in the company's history as “the most advanced mill in the world”. A series of acquisitions widened the product range. The Peerless Fence and Products, bought in 1960 gave RJN a major presence in chain link fencing while the Spencer Wire Company (1964) added wire mesh. Spencer also had a 35-acre site at Wakefield which became the new home for the copper wire plant in 1967.

=== Jessel Securities and the Merger ===
During 1970 Jessel Securities acquired a near 40 per cent holding in RJN; Oliver Jessel joined the Board, becoming Chairman shortly after. Jesssel had made his early money promoting unit and investment trusts before turning his attention to what he regarded as undervalued quoted companies. Jessel orchestrated the purchase of John Rugby & Sons, a wire drawing competitor, in 1971, followed by Leeds Assets, where Jessel was also chairman. Leeds had a £6m. portfolio of quoted securities which gave RJN added financial strength. Jessel's final act in 1973 was to merge RJN with Thomas Firth & John Brown to form Johnson and Firth Brown. Jessel Securities collapsed in October 1974 amidst the secondary banking crisis. Johnson and Firth Brown continued through various acquisitions, joint ventures and sales until the rump of the business merged in 1987 and the Johnson name was no more.
