= May Kendall =

English poet, novelist, and satirist

May Kendall (born Emma Goldworth Kendall; 1861 – 1943) was an English poet, novelist, and satirist. She is best known as the co-author of the novel That Very Mab and the poetry collections Dreams to Sell and Songs from Dreamland. She studied at Somerville College, Oxford.

Kendall is attributed with abridging some of the tales in the first six of Lang's Fairy Books, she also collaborated with Andrew Lang on The Very Mab. Possibly her most anthologized poem, "Lay of the Trilobite," is a satire of the popular English response to Darwin's evolutionary theory. "Lay of the Trilobite" was originally published in Punch Magazine, to which Kendall contributed for ten years. Much of her literary output focuses on evolution and other scientific discoveries, the New Woman, and satirical portraits of British society and its hypocrisy. In 1895 Kendall partially gave up professional writing in order to more fully devote her life to social reform. She worked predominantly with the Rowntree Family in York.

Kendall died in poverty at a public assistance institution in York. The death certificate stated that she was suffering from life-long dementia. Her unmarked grave is in York Cemetery.

== Works ==
- (with Andrew Lang) That Very Mab (1885)
- Dreams to Sell (1887)
- Songs from Dreamland (1894)
- Turkish Bonds (1895)
- (with Seebohm Rowntree) How the Labourer Lives: A Study of the Rural Labour Problem (1913)
