= Baltimore Federation of Labor =

Trade union affiliated with the AFL

The Baltimore Federation of Labor (BFL), an affiliate of the American Federation of Labor, was formed in 1883, in Baltimore, Maryland.

== History ==
In 1919, the Baltimore Federation of Labor helped found the Baltimore Labor College as an outgrowth of its adult education department.

The Baltimore Federation of Labor was considered conservative. It was allied with the United Garment Workers of America. In 1913, it had a battle with the Wobblies for representation of Baltimore garment industry workers.

== See also ==
- American Federation of Labor
- Baltimore Labor College
