= Bedaux Unit =

The Bedaux Unit emerged from the U.S. scientific management movement. It remains in daily use in measuring and comparing manual labor to this day. The Bedaux unit is a universal measure for manual work and is used both to compare the work done by individuals for measuring and driving efficiency in industry.

== History ==
=== F. W. Taylor's time studies (1909) ===
While F. W. Taylor remains famous for conducting time studies on employees, these studies' influence on subsequent workplaces have long been harder to determine.

Recent research has revealed that the core purpose of Taylor's time studies was to produce Unit-Times data, as espoused in his Shop Management (1903) and Concrete Costs (1912), which he co-authored with Sanford E. Thompson.

=== Emerson Consulting (1900-1930) ===
The key individual who spotted Taylor's focus on Unit-Times was Harrington Emerson and his firm Emerson Consulting. Emerson's circle was the basis for several innovations with Unit-Times by his followers Charles E. Knoeppel, Charles E. Bedaux and Earl K. Wennerlund.

=== The Bedaux B (1920 - 1950s) ===
Building on Taylor's Unit-Times, and his experience at Emerson Consulting, Bedaux introduced the practice of rating assessment. Through rating Bedaux developed the "Bedaux System of Human Power Measurement" which arrived at a universal measure for all manual work, the Bedaux Unit or B.

The Bedaux B, and units derived from it such as the Rowntree Mark and the Urwick, Orr & Partners Point, led to improvements in the comparability of employee and departmental efficiency, as well as labor and activist disputes about the purpose and practices of time studies and the B.

Bedaux's claims to originality in making this innovation remain a topic of debate.

=== British Standard 3138 (1959) ===
The Bedaux consultancy, its offshoots, and the Bedaux System were particularly influential in Britain well into the 1950s.

In 1959, the British Standards Institution issued British Standard 3138 (Work Study), which was based on the Bedaux B. British Standard 3138 was reissued in 1979 and 1992, and remains in daily use in job evaluations today.
