= Work measurement =

Process for estimating the time to perform a task

Work measurement is the application of techniques which is designed to establish the time for an average worker to carry out a specified manufacturing task at a defined level of performance. It is concerned with the duration of time it takes to complete a work task assigned to a specific job. It means the time taken to complete one unit of work or operation it also that the work should completely complete in a complete basis under certain circumstances which take into account of accountants time

== Usage ==
Work measurement helps to uncover non-standardization that exist in the workplace and non-value adding activities and waste. A work has to be measured for the following reasons:

1. To discover and eliminate lost or ineffective time.
2. To establish standard times for performance measurement.
3. To measure performance against realistic expectations.
4. To set operating goals and objectives.

== Techniques ==
- Analytical estimating
- Predetermined motion time systems
- Standard data system
- Synthesis from elemental data
- Time study
- Work sampling

== Purpose ==
Work Measurement is a technique for establishing a Standard Time, which is the required time to perform a given task, based on time measurements of the work content of the prescribed method, with due consideration for fatigue and for personal and unavoidable delays. Method study is the principal technique for reducing the work involved, primarily by eliminating unnecessary movement on the part of material or operatives and by substituting good methods for poor ones. Work measurement is concerned with investigating, reducing and subsequently eliminating ineffective time, that is time during which no effective work is being performed, whatever the cause. Work measurement, as the name suggests, provides management with a means of measuring the time taken in the performance of an operation or series of operations in such a way that ineffective time is shown up and can be separated from effective time. In this way its existence, nature and extent become known where previously they were concealed within the total.

== Uses ==
Revealing existing causes of ineffective time through study, important though it is, is perhaps less important in the long term than the setting of sound time standards, since these will continue to apply as long as the work to which they refer continues to be done. They will also show up any ineffective time or additional work which may occur once they have been established.

In the process of setting standards it may be necessary to use work measurement:

To compare the efficiency of alternative methods. Other conditions being equal, the method which takes the least time will be the best method. To balance the work of members of teams, in association with multiple activity charts, so that, as nearly as possible, each member has a task taking an equal time to perform. To determine, in association with man and machine multiple activity charts, the number of machines an operative can run.

The time standards, once set, may then be used:

To provide information on which the planning and scheduling of production can be based, including the plant and labour requirements for carrying out the programme of work and the utilisation of available capacity. To provide information on which estimates for tenders, selling prices and delivery promises can be based. To set standards of machine utilisation and labour performance which can be used for any of the above purposes and as a basis for incentive schemes. To provide information for labour-cost control and to enable standard costs to be fixed and maintained. It is thus clear that work measurement provides the basic information necessary for all the activities of organising and controlling the work of an enterprise in which the time element plays a part. Its uses in connection with these activities will be more clearly seen when we have shown how the standard time is obtained.

== Techniques of work measurement ==
The following are the principal techniques by which work measurement is carried out:

1. Time study
2. Activity sampling
3. Predetermined motion time systems
4. Synthesis from standard data
5. Estimating
6. Analytical estimating
7. Comparative estimating

Of these techniques we shall concern ourselves primarily with time study, since it is the basic technique of work measurement. Some of the other techniques either derive from it or are variants of it.

=== Time study ===
Time Study consists of recording times and rates of work for elements of a specified job carried out under specified conditions to obtain the time necessary to carry out a job at a defined level of performance.

In this technique the job to be studied is timed with a stopwatch, rated, and the Basic Time calculated.

==== Requirements for effective time study ====
The requirements for effective time study are:

a. Co-operation and goodwill b. Defined job c. Defined method d. Correct normal equipment e. Quality standard and checks f. Experienced qualified motivated worker g. Method of timing h. Method of assessing relative performance i. Elemental breakdown j. Definition of break points k. Recording media

One of the most critical requirements for time study is that of elemental breakdown. There are some general rules concerning the way in which a job should be broken down into elements. They include the following. Elements should be easily identifiable, with definite beginnings and endings so that, once established, they can be repeatedly recognised. These points are known as the break points and should be clearly described on the study sheet. Elements should be as short as can be conveniently timed by the observer. As far as possible, elements – particularly manual ones – should be chosen so that they represent naturally unified and distinct segments of the operation.

==== Performance rating ====
Time Study is based on a record of observed times for doing a job together with an assessment by the observer of the speed and effectiveness of the worker in relation to the observer's concept of Standard Rating.

This assessment is known as rating, the definition being given in BS 3138 (1979):

The numerical value or symbol used to denote a rate of working.

Standard rating is also defined (in this British Standard BS3138) as:

"The rating corresponding to the average rate at which qualified workers will naturally work, provided that they adhere to the specified method and that they are motivated to apply themselves to their work. If the standard rating is consistently maintained and the appropriate relaxation is taken, a qualified worker will achieve standard performance over the working day or shift."

Industrial engineers use a variety of rating scales, and one which has achieved wide use is the British Standards Rating Scale which is a scale where 0 corresponds to no activity and 100 corresponds to standard rating. Rating should be expressed as 'X' BS.

Below is an illustration of the Standard Scale:

Rating walking pace

0 no activity 50 very slow 75 steady 100 brisk (standard rating) 125 very fast 150 exceptionally fast The basic time for a task, or element, is the time for carrying out an element of work or an operation at standard rating.

Basic time = observed time x observed rating

The result is expressed in basic minutes – BMs.

The work content of a job or operation is defined as: basic time + relaxation allowance + any allowance for additional work – e.g. that part of contingency allowance which represents work.

==== Standard time ====
Standard time is the total time in which a job should be completed at standard performance i.e. work content, contingency allowance for delay, unoccupied time and interference allowance, where applicable.

Allowance for unoccupied time and for interference may be important for the measurement of machine-controlled operations, but they do not always appear in every computation of standard time. Relaxation allowance, on the other hand, has to be taken into account in every computation, whether the job is a simple manual one or a very complex operation requiring the simultaneous control of several machines. A contingency allowance will probably figure quite frequently in the compilation of standard times; it is therefore convenient to consider the contingency allowance and relaxation allowance, so that the sequence of calculation which started with the completion of observations at the workplace may be taken right through to the compilation of standard time.

Contingency allowance

A contingency allowance is a small allowance of time which may be included in a standard time to meet legitimate and expected items of work or delays, the precise measurement of which is uneconomical because of their infrequent or irregular occurrence.

Relaxation allowance

A relaxation allowance is an addition to the basic time to provide the worker with the opportunity to recover from physiological and psychological effects of carrying out specified work under specified conditions and to allow attention to personal needs. The amount of the allowance will depend on the nature of the job. Examples are:

Personal 5–7% Energy output 0–10% Noisy 0–5% Conditions 0–100% e.g. Electronics 5%

Other allowances

Other allowances include process allowance which is to cover when an operator is prevented from continuing with their work, although ready and waiting, by the process or machine requiring further time to complete its part of the job. A final allowance is that of Interference which is included whenever an operator has charge of more than one machine and the machines are subject to random stoppage. In normal circumstances the operator can only attend to one machine, and the others must wait for attention. This machine is then subject to interference which increased the machine cycle time.

It is now possible to obtain a complete picture of the standard time for a straightforward manual operation.

=== Activity Sampling ===
Activity sampling is a technique in which a large number of instantaneous observations are made over a period of time of a group of machines, processes or workers. Each observation records what is happening at that instant and the percentage of observations recorded for a particular activity or delay is a measure of the percentage of time during which the activity or delay occurs.

The advantages of this method are that

It is capable of measuring many activities that are impractical or too costly to be measured by time study. One observer can collect data concerning the simultaneous activities of a group. Activity sampling can be interrupted at any time without effect. The disadvantages are that

It is quicker and cheaper to use time study on jobs of short duration. It does not provide elemental detail. The type of information provided by an activity sampling study is:

1. The proportion of the working day during which workers or machines are producing.
2. The proportion of the working day used up by delays. The reason for each delay must be recorded.
3. The relative activity of different workers and machines.

To determine the number of observations in a full study the following equation is used:

Where:

=== Predetermined motion time system ===
A predetermined motion time system is a work measurement technique whereby times established for basic human motions (classified according to the nature of the motion and the conditions under which it is made) are used to build up the time for a job at a defined level of performance.

The systems are based on the assumption that all manual tasks can be analysed into basic motions of the body or body members. They were compiled as a result of a very large number of studies of each movement, generally by a frame-by-frame analysis of films of a wide range of subjects, men and women, performing a wide variety of tasks.

The first generation of PMT systems, MTM1, were very finely detailed, involving much analysis and producing extremely accurate results. This attention to detail was both a strength and a weakness, and for many potential applications the quantity of detailed analysis was not necessary, and prohibitively time -consuming. In these cases "second generation" techniques, such as Simplified PMTS, Master Standard Data, Primary Standard Data and MTM2, could be used with advantage, and no great loss of accuracy. For even speedier application, where some detail could be sacrificed then a "third generation" technique such as Basic Work Data or MTM3 could be used.

=== Synthesis ===
Synthesis is a work measurement technique for building up the time for a job at a defined level of performance by totaling element times obtained previously from time studies on other jobs containing the elements concerned, or from synthetic data.

Synthetic data is the name given to tables and formulae derived from the analysis of accumulated work measurement data, arranged in a form suitable for building up standard times, machine process times, etc. by synthesis.

Synthetic times are increasingly being used as a substitute for individual time studies in the case of jobs made up of elements which have recurred a sufficient number of times in jobs previously studied to make it possible to compile accurate representative times for them.

=== Estimating ===
The technique of estimating is the least refined of all those available to the work measurement practitioner. It consists of an estimate of total job duration (or in common practice, the job price or cost). This estimate is made by a craftsman or person familiar with the craft. It normally embraces the total components of the job, including work content, preparation and disposal time, any contingencies etc., all estimated in one gross amount.

=== Analytical estimating ===
This technique introduces work measurement concepts into estimating. In analytical estimating the estimator is trained in elemental breakdown, and in the concept of standard performance. The estimate is prepared by first breaking the work content of the job into elements, and then utilising the experience of the estimator (normally a craftsman) the time for each element of work is estimated – at standard performance. These estimated basic minutes are totalled to give a total job time, in basic minutes. An allowance for relaxation and any necessary contingency is then made, as in conventional time study, to give the standard time.

=== Comparative estimating ===
This technique has been developed to permit speedy and reliable assessment of the duration of variable and infrequent jobs, by estimating them within chosen time bands. Limits are set within which the job under consideration will fall, rather than in terms of precise capital standard or capital allowed minute values. It is applied by comparing the job to be estimated with jobs of similar work content, and using these similar jobs as "bench marks" to locate the new job in its relevant time band – known as Work Group.

== Uses ==
- To balance the work of members of teams, in association with the multiple activity charts, so that, as far as possible, each member has tasks taking an equal time.
- To compare the efficiency of alternative methods. Other conditions being equal, the method which takes the least time will be the best method.
- To determine, in association with man and machine multiple activity charts, the number of machines a worker can run.

== Balayla model – work measurement in the service sector ==
The work measurement concept has evolved from the manufacturing world but has not been fully adopted yet to the global shift to the service sector. Certain factors create inherent difficulties in determining standard times for labor allocation in service jobs: (a) wide variation in Time Between Arrivals and Service Performance Time; (b) the difficulty of assessing the damage done to the organization by long customer Waiting Times for service. This difficulty makes it hard to calculate the Break-Even Point between raising worker output, which minimizes labor costs but increases customer Waiting Times and reduces service quality. Dr. Isaac Balayla & Professor Yissachar Gilad from the Technion, Israel, developed the Balayla (Balaila) Model which overcomes most of the above-mentioned difficulties, by taking a multi-domain approach: 1) The model deploys a series of indicators for a correlation between output and Waiting Times. The indicator values are affected by service level of urgency. 2) the model determines the best Break-Even point by comparing the operational cost of an additional worker with the economical benefit caused by the decrease in WT. Thus, the model finds the best balance between worker output and service quality.
