= Seebohm Rowntree =

English social researcher (1871–1954)

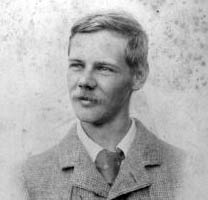
- Born: 7 July 1871; York, England
- Died: 7 October 1954 (aged 83); Hughenden Manor, Buckinghamshire, England
- Occupations: Industrialist, sociological researcher and writer
- Writing career
- Period: 1899–1954

Benjamin Seebohm Rowntree, CH (7 July 1871 – 7 October 1954) was an English sociological researcher, social reformer and industrialist. He is known in particular for his three studies of poverty in York, conducted in 1899, 1935, and 1951.

The first York study involved a comprehensive survey of the living conditions of the poor in York during which investigators visited every working class household, and his methodology inspired many subsequent researches in British empirical sociology.

By strictly defining the concept of poverty in his studies, he was able to reveal that the causes of poverty in York were more structural than moral, such as low wages, which went against the traditionally held view that the poor were responsible for their own plight.

== Life ==
Seebohm Rowntree was born in York, the second son of the Quaker industrialist Joseph Rowntree and his wife Emma Antoinette Seebohm, daughter of Wilhelm Seebohm. He was educated first privately and then from the age of 10 at Bootham School. Rowntree studied chemistry at Owen's College, Manchester for five terms before joining the family firm in 1889, where he laid the foundations of the firm's first chemistry department. He became the first Labour Director in 1897 when the firm became a limited liability company and was the chairman from 1923 to 1941. During the First World War, he was Director of the Welfare Department at the Ministry of Munitions, under the leadership of David Lloyd George.

In 1897, he married Lydia Potter (1868/9–1944), daughter of Edwin Potter, an engineer; they had four sons and one daughter. After his wife died, he lived in a wing of Former Prime Minister Benjamin Disraeli's old house, Hughenden Manor, where he died after a heart attack in 1954. He was 83 years old.

== Work ==
=== First York study (1899) ===
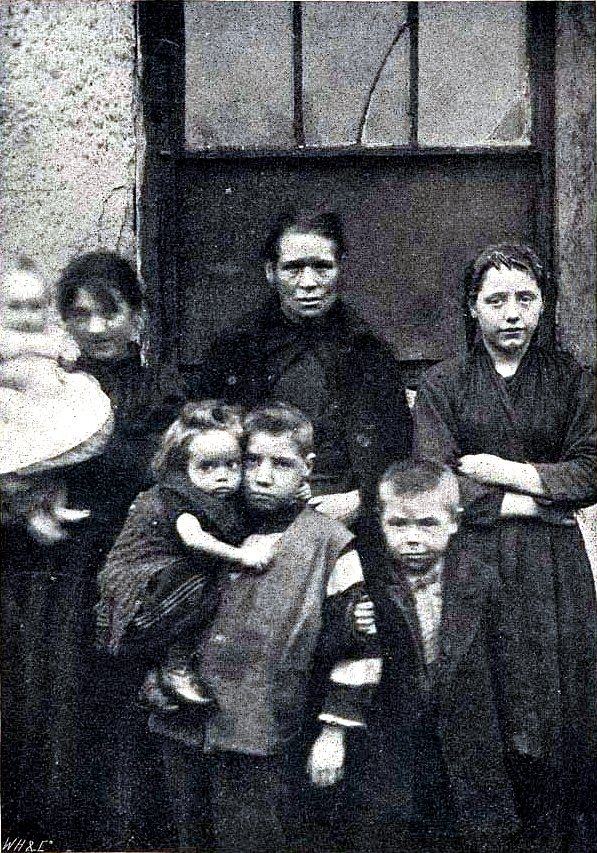
Poverty in towns, slum dwellers in Dublin, Ireland c. 1901

Rowntree investigated poverty in York, inspired by the work of his father Joseph Rowntree and the work of Charles Booth in London. He carried out a comprehensive survey into the living conditions of the poor in York during which investigators visited every working class household. This amounted to the detailed study of 11,560 families or 46,754 individuals. The results of this study were published in 1901 in his book Poverty, A Study of Town Life.

In Rowntree's work, he surveyed working-class families in York and drew a poverty line in terms of a minimum weekly sum of money "necessary to enable families... to secure the necessaries of a healthy life" (quoted in Coates and Silburn, 1970). The money needed for this subsistence level of existence covered fuel and light, rent, food, clothing, household and personal items, adjusted according to family size. He determined this level using social scientific methods which had not been applied to the study of poverty before. For example, he consulted leading nutritionists of the period to discover the minimum calorific intake and nutritional balance necessary before people got ill or lost weight. He then surveyed the prices of food in York to find the cheapest prices in the area for purchasing the food required by this minimum diet and used this information to set his poverty line.

According to this measure, 27.84 percent of the total population of York lived below the poverty line. This result corresponded with that from Charles Booth's study of poverty in London and so challenged the view, commonly held at the time, that abject poverty was a problem particular to London and was not widespread in the rest of Britain. Rowntree's (1901) statistics have since been challenged by other sociological researchers such as Gazeley and Newell (2000) who argued he "overestimated the needs of children relative to adults and did not allow for economies of scale", resulting in inflated measurement of primary poverty.

He placed those below his poverty line into two groups depending on the reason for their poverty. Those in primary poverty did not have enough income to meet the expenditure necessary for their basic needs. Those classed as in secondary poverty had high enough income to meet basic needs but some portion of this money was being spent elsewhere (such as on drink, gambling, and betting) and so they were unable to then afford the necessities of life.

Setting a primary poverty line for which "[e]xpenditure needful for the development of the mortal, moral and social sides of human nature will not be taken into account'' (136) did not mean that he did not recognise the non-subsistence need of the working class. Rather, he wished to measure a type of poverty that could not be reduced simply by greater "thrift", so as to cast off the contemporary social myth about poverty as one's own fault. Ironically, this primary poverty line also helped many manufactures to set the lowest possible minimum wage, which engendered many criticisms toward him.

In analysing the results of the investigation he found that people at certain stages of life, for example in old age and early childhood, were more likely to be in abject poverty, living below the poverty line, than at other stages of life. From this he formulated the idea of the poverty cycle in which some people moved in and out of absolute poverty during their lives. This idea of poverty cycle captured important longitudinal aspects of poverty that were cited later in much other research.

=== Second York study (1936) ===
Rowntree conducted a further study of poverty in York in 1936 under the title Poverty and Progress. This was based largely on a similar research method as his earlier study and found absolute poverty among the working class in York had decreased by 50% since his first study. However, as he changed his definition of the poverty line, and so the measure of absolute poverty, it is not a direct comparison from his earlier study. In this study he included allowances for some items which were not strictly necessary for survival, these included newspapers, books, radios, beer, tobacco, holidays, and presents. His results showed that the causes of poverty had changed considerably in a few decades. In the 1890s, the major reason for primary poverty was low wages, 52%, whereas in the 1930s unemployment accounted for 44.53% and low wages only 10%.

Despite the inclusion of the extra items, he found that the percentage of his sample population in poverty had dropped to 18 per cent in 1936 and to 1.5 per cent in 1950.

=== Third York study (1951) ===
Rowntree published a third study of York's poverty in 1951 under the title Poverty and the Welfare State which was produced in collaboration with his research assistant G. R. Lavers. Unlike his other studies of York a sampling technique was used rather than a comprehensive survey, as he had primarily tested its viability in his second York study, though he did not adopt it in the previous time.

By the 1950s, it appeared that absolute poverty was a minor problem although poverty did remain, for example among the elderly, but it was believed that increased welfare benefits would soon eradicate this lingering poverty. The conquest of poverty was put down to an expanding economy as the 1950s were the years of the 'affluent society', to government policies of full employment, and to the success of the welfare state. It was widely believed that the operation of the welfare state had redistributed wealth from rich to poor and significantly raised working class living standards.

=== Other writings ===
David Lloyd George urged Rowntree to write on rural living conditions in Britain: The Land (1913) and How the Labourer Lives (1913) looked at the living conditions of farming families. Rowntree argued that an increase in landholdings would make agriculture more productive.

His work The Human Needs of Labour (1918) argued for family allowances and a national minimum wage, and in The Human Factor in Business, Rowntree argued that business owners should adopt more democratic practices like those at his own factory rather than more autocratic leadership styles. He expressed his conviction of the possibility of establishing a close-knit community including both the management and the workers.

In the study of his later period, English Life and Leisure: A Social Study (1951), he inquired into the ways people spent their relative, newly-found leisure and income; but this work suffered more conceptual difficulties than his former works.

== Influence ==
=== Liberal reforms ===
Rowntree was a supporter of the Liberal Party and hoped that his work would influence Liberal politicians. Rowntree became close friends with David Lloyd George in 1907 after the two men met when Lloyd George was serving as President of the Board of Trade. The influence of Rowntree can be seen in the Liberal reforms passed by the Liberals when in power. He was a member of the Liberal Industrial Inquiry which published Britain's Industrial Future, better known as the Yellow Book, in 1928. In 1930, he co-wrote, with Lloyd George and Philip Kerr, the Liberal Party's plan How to Tackle Unemployment. In June 1936, he was elected to serve on the Liberal Party Council.

=== Labour Party ===
Poverty and Progress impacted on the policies of the post-war Labour government and Poverty and the Welfare State was used in a 1951 Labour party election manifesto headed Ending Poverty although this was without his knowledge.

== Industrialist and philanthropist ==
Seebohm and the Rowntree's firm broke new ground in terms of industrial relations, welfare and management. Lyndall Urwick describes him as "the British management movement's greatest pioneer" in his book Golden Book of Management. Rowntree's Quaker upbringing influenced his business practice; he believed that the existence of companies which paid low wages was bad for the "nation's economy and humanity". "More a philanthropist than a capitalist", he introduced various reforms in the working condition of the workers: the establishment of the eight-hour day in 1896, a pension scheme in 1906, a five-day work week and work councils in 1919, the establishment of a psychology department in 1922, and a profit-sharing plan in 1923.

Rowntree was also personally involved in two major conciliation efforts following strikes in 1919 and 1926.

In 1947 when the British Institute of Management was created he became an Honorary Founder Member and in 1952 the first English person to become an Honorary Fellow of the institute.

== Rowntree's Cocoa Works ==
The Rowntree Cocoa Works was a site of great scientific investigation and became internationally known as such.

Rowntree was a great believer in trained specialists, and employed many at the Cocoa Works. They included Oliver Sheldon, Lyndall Urwick and Dr Clarence Northcott. The Works was a corporate member of the Taylor Society and was admired by its President Henry S. Dennison.

Seebohm oversaw the formation of an industrial psychology department in 1922 which pioneered the use of psychological recruitment tests in British industry. Employing psychologist Victor Moorrees who developed a new test, the form board selection test, to ascertain how well prospective employees would be able to fit chocolates into their box.

He was also heavily involved in the National Institute of Industrial Psychology serving on its executive committee from its foundation in 1921, as chairman from 1940 to 1947, until his resignation in 1949.

== See also ==
- Joseph Rowntree
- Joseph Rowntree Foundation

== Bibliography ==
- Poverty, A Study of Town Life (1901) online
- Betting & Gambling: A National Evil (1905)
- Land and Labour, Lessons from Belgium (1910)
- Unemployment, A Social Study by Rowntree and Bruno Lasker (1911)
- The Land (1913)
- How the Labourer Lives, A Study of the Rural Labour Problem by Rowntree and May Kendall (1913)
- How far it is possible to provide Satisfactory Houses for the Working Classes at rents which they can afford to pay, Warburton lecture, 1914
- Lectures on Housing by Rowntree and A. C. Pigou (1914)
- The Way to Industrial Peace and the Problem of Unemployment (1914)
- The Human Needs of Labour (1918)
- The Human Factor in Business (1921)
- The responsibility of Women Workers for Dependants by Rowntree and Frank Stuart (1921)
- Industrial Unrest, A way Out (1922)
- How to Tackle Unemployment (with David Lloyd George and the Marquess of Lothian), 1930
- Poverty and Progress (1941)
- Poverty and the Welfare State by Rowntree and G. R. Lavers (1951)
- English Life and Leisure: A Social Study by Rowntree and G. R. Lavers (1951) online
