= Efficiency movement =

Movement intended to eliminate "waste" in all areas of life

The efficiency movement was a major movement in the United States, Britain and other industrial nations in the early 20th century that sought to identify and eliminate waste in all areas of the economy and society, and to develop and implement best practices. The concept covered mechanical, economic, social, and personal improvement. The quest for efficiency promised effective, dynamic management rewarded by growth.

As a result of the influence of an early proponent, it is more often known as Taylorism.

== United States ==
The efficiency movement played a central role in the Progressive Era in the United States, where it flourished 1890–1932. Adherents argued that all aspects of the economy, society and government were riddled with waste and inefficiency. Everything would be better if experts identified the problems and fixed them. The result was strong support for building research universities and schools of business and engineering, municipal research agencies, as well as reform of hospitals and medical schools, and the practice of farming. Perhaps the best known leaders were engineers Frederick Winslow Taylor (1856–1915), who used a stopwatch to identify the smallest inefficiencies, and Frank Bunker Gilbreth Sr. (1868–1924) who proclaimed there was always "one best way" to fix a problem.

Leaders including Herbert Croly, Charles R. van Hise, and Richard Ely sought to improve governmental performance by training experts in public service comparable to those in Germany, notably at the Universities of Wisconsin and Pennsylvania. Schools of business administration set up management programs oriented toward efficiency.

=== Municipal and state efficiency ===
Many cities set up "efficiency bureaus" to identify waste and apply the best practices. For example, Chicago created an Efficiency Division (1910–1916) within the city government's Civil Service Commission, and private citizens organized the Chicago Bureau of Public Efficiency (1910–1932). The former pioneered the study of "personal efficiency," measuring employees' performance through new scientific merit systems and efficiency movement

State governments were active as well. For example, Massachusetts set up its "Commission on Economy and Efficiency" in 1912. It made hundreds of recommendations.

=== Philanthropy ===
Leading philanthropists such as Andrew Carnegie and John D. Rockefeller actively promoted the efficiency movement. In his many philanthropic pursuits, Rockefeller believed in supporting efficiency. He said

To help an inefficient, ill-located, unnecessary school is a waste ... it is highly probable that enough money has been squandered on unwise educational projects to have built up a national system of higher education adequate to our needs, if the money had been properly directed to that end.

=== Conservation ===
The conservation movement regarding national resources came to prominence during the Progressive Era. According to historian Samuel P. Hays, the conservation movement was based on the "gospel of the efficiency".

The Massachusetts Commission on Economy and Efficiency reflected the new concern with conservation. It said in 1912:

The only proper basis for the protection of game birds, wild fowl and, indeed, all animals is an economic one, and must be based upon carefully constructed and properly enforced laws for the conservation of all species for the benefit of future generations of our citizens, rather than based on local opinion. ...This expenditure for the protection of fish and game is clearly a wise economy, tending to prevent the annihilation of birds and other animals valuable to mankind which might otherwise become extinct. It may be said that Massachusetts and her sister States have suffered irreparable loss by carelessly allowing, for generations past, indiscriminate waste of animal life.

President Roosevelt was the nation's foremost conservationist, putting the issue high on the national agenda by emphasizing the need to eliminate wasteful uses of limited natural resources. He worked with all the major figures of the movement, especially his chief advisor on the matter, Gifford Pinchot. Roosevelt was deeply committed to conserving natural resources, and is considered to be the nation's first conservation President.

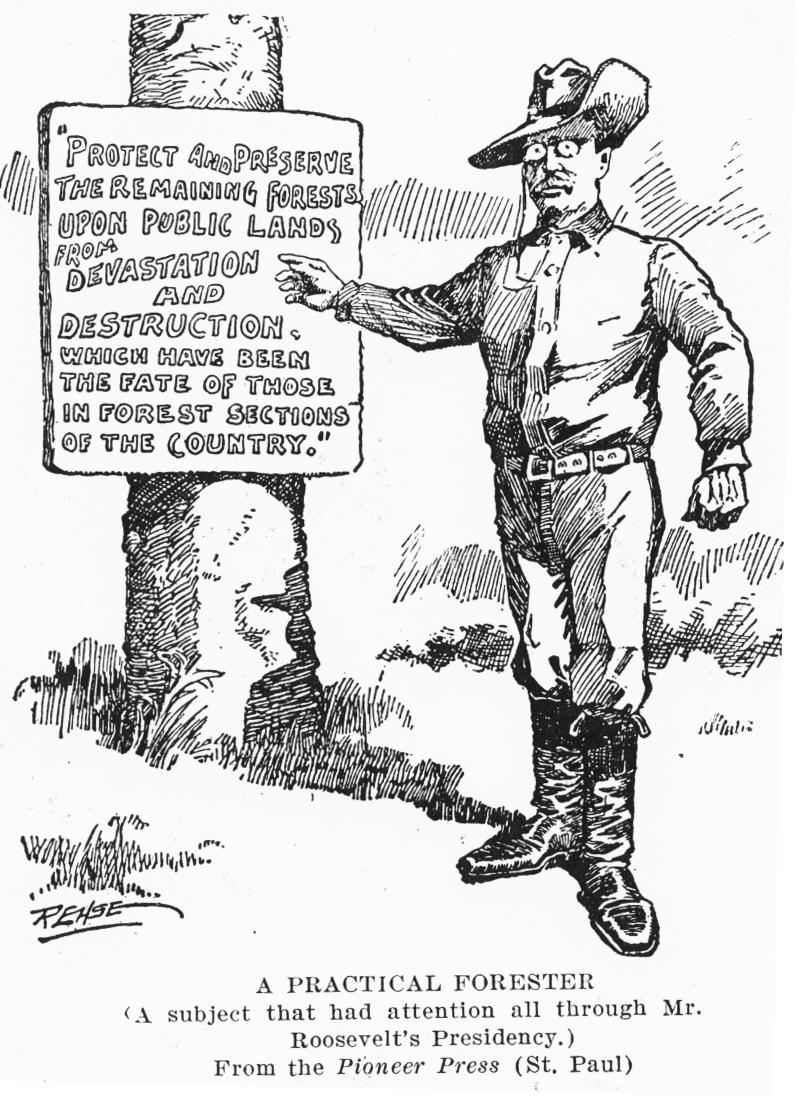
1908 US editorial cartoon on Theodore Roosevelt and conservation

In 1908, Roosevelt sponsored the Conference of Governors held in the White House, with a focus on natural resources and their most efficient use. Roosevelt delivered the opening address: "Conservation as a National Duty".

In contrast, environmentalist John Muir promulgated a very different view of conservation, rejecting the efficiency motivation. Muir instead preached that nature was sacred and humans are intruders who should look but not develop. Working through the Sierra Club he founded, Muir tried to minimize commercial use of water resources and forests. While Muir wanted nature preserved for the sake of pure beauty, Roosevelt subscribed to Pinchot's formulation, "to make the forest produce the largest amount of whatever crop or service will be most useful, and keep on producing it for generation after generation of men and trees."

=== National politics ===
In U.S. national politics, the most prominent figure was Herbert Hoover, a trained engineer who played down politics and believed dispassionate, nonpolitical experts could solve the nation's great problems, such as ending poverty.

After 1929, Democrats blamed the Great Depression on Hoover and helped to somewhat discredit the movement.

=== Antitrust ===
Boston lawyer Louis Brandeis (1856–1941) argued bigness conflicted with efficiency and added a new political dimension to the Efficiency Movement. For instance, while fighting against legalized price fixing, Brandeis launched an effort to influence congressional policymaking with the help of his friend Norman Hapgood, who was then the editor of Harper's Weekly. He coordinated the publication of a series of articles (Competition Kills, Efficiency and the One-Price Article, and How Europe deals with the one-price goods), which were also distributed by the lobbying group American Fair Trade League to legislators, Supreme Court justices, governors, and twenty national magazines. For his works, he was asked to speak before a congressional committee considering the price-fixing bill he drafted. Here, he stated that "big business is not more efficient than little business" and that "it is a mistake to suppose that the department stores can do business cheaper than the little dealer." Brandeis ideas on which business is most efficient conflicted with Croly's positions, which favored efficiency driven by a kind of consolidation gained through large-scale economic operations.

As early as 1895 Brandeis had warned of the harm that giant corporations could do to competitors, customers, and their own workers. The growth of industrialization was creating mammoth companies which he felt threatened the well-being of millions of Americans. In The Curse of Bigness he argued, "Efficiency means greater production with less effort and at less cost, through the elimination of unnecessary waste, human and material. How else can we hope to attain our social ideals?" He also argued against an appeal to Congress by the state-regulated railroad industry in 1910 seeking an increase in rates. Brandeis explained that instead of passing along increased costs to the consumer, the railroads should pursue efficiency by reducing their overhead and streamlining their operations, initiatives that were unprecedented during the time.

=== Bedaux system ===
Charles E. Bedaux: "The Bedaux Unit Principle of Industrial Measurement", Journal of Applied Psychology, 1921. PDF, click to read.

The Bedaux system, developed by Franco-American management consultant Charles Bedaux (1886–1944) built on the work of F. W. Taylor and Charles E. Knoeppel.

Its distinctive advancement beyond these earlier thinkers was the Bedaux Unit or B, a universal measure for all manual work.

The Bedaux System was influential in the United States in the 1920s and Europe in the 1930s and 1940s, especially in Britain.

From the 1920s to the 1950s there were about one thousand companies in 21 countries worldwide that were run on the Bedaux System, including giants such as Swift's, Eastman Kodak, B.F. Goodrich, DuPont, Fiat, ICI and General Electric.

=== Relation to other movements ===
Later movements had echoes of the Efficiency Movement and were more directly inspired by Taylor and Taylorism. Technocracy, for instance, and others flourished in the 1930s and 1940s.

Postmodern opponents of nuclear energy in the 1970s broadened their attack to try to discredit movements that saw salvation for human society in technical expertise alone, or which held that scientists or engineers had any special expertise to offer in the political realm.

Coming into usage in 1990, the Western term lean manufacturing (lean enterprise, lean production, or simply "lean") refers to a business idea that considered the expenditure of resources for anything other than the creation of value for the end customer to be wasteful, and thus a target for elimination. Today the Lean concept is broadening to include a greater range of strategic goals, not just cost-cutting and efficiency.

== Britain ==
In engineering, the concept of efficiency was developed in Britain in the mid-18th century by John Smeaton (1724–1792). Called the "father of civil engineering", he studied water wheels and steam engines. In the late 19th century there was much talk about improving the efficiency of the administration and economic performance of the British Empire.

National Efficiency was an attempt to discredit the old-fashioned habits, customs and institutions that put the British at a handicap in competition with the world, especially with Germany, which was seen as the epitome of efficiency. In the early 20th century, "National Efficiency" became a powerful demand — a movement supported by prominent figures across the political spectrum who disparaged sentimental humanitarianism and identified waste as a mistake that could no longer be tolerated. The movement took place in two waves; the first wave from 1899 to 1905 was made urgent by the inefficiencies and failures in the Second Boer War (1899–1902). Spectator magazine reported in 1902 there was "a universal outcry for efficiency in all departments of society, in all aspects of life". The two most important themes were technocratic efficiency and managerial efficiency. As White (1899) argued vigorously, the empire needed to be put on a business footing and administered to get better results. The looming threat of Germany, which was widely seen as a much more efficient nation, added urgency after 1902. Politically National Efficiency brought together modernizing Conservatives and Unionists, Liberals who wanted to modernize their party, and Fabians such as George Bernard Shaw and H. G. Wells, along with Beatrice and Sidney Webb, who had outgrown socialism and saw the utopia of a scientifically up-to-date society supervised by experts such as themselves. Churchill in 1908 formed an alliance with the Webbs, announcing the goal of a "National Minimum", covering hours, working conditions, and wages – it was a safety net below which the individual would not be allowed to fall.

Representative legislation included the Education Act 1902, which emphasized the role of experts in the schools system. Higher education was an important initiative, typified by the growth of the London School of Economics, and the foundation of Imperial College.

There was a pause in the movement between 1904 and 1909, when interest resumed. The most prominent new leaders included Liberals Winston Churchill and David Lloyd George, whose influence brought a bundle of reform legislation that introduced the welfare state to Britain.

Much of the popular and elite support for National Efficiency grew out of concern for Britain's military position, especially with respect to Germany. The Royal Navy underwent a dramatic modernization, most famously in the introduction of the Dreadnought, which in 1906 revolutionized naval warfare overnight.

== Germany ==
In Germany the efficiency movement was called "rationalization" and it was a powerful social and economic force before 1933. In part it looked explicitly at American models, especially Fordism. The Bedaux system was widely adopted in the rubber and tire industry, despite strong resistance in the socialist labor movement to the Bedaux system. Continental AG, the leading rubber company in Germany, adopted the system and profited heavily from it, thus surviving the Great Depression relatively undamaged and improving its competitive capabilities. However most German businessmen preferred the home-grown REFA system which focused on the standardization of working conditions, tools, and machinery.

"Rationalization" meant higher productivity and greater efficiency, promising science would bring prosperity. More generally it promised a new level of modernity and was applied to economic production and consumption as well as public administration. Various versions of rationalization were promoted by industrialists and Social Democrats, by engineers and architects, by educators and academics, by middle class feminists and social workers, by government officials and politicians of many parties. It was ridiculed by the extremists in the Communist movement. As ideology and practice, rationalization challenged and transformed not only machines, factories, and vast business enterprises but also the lives of middle-class and working-class Germans.

== Soviet Union ==
Ideas of Science Management was very popular in the Soviet Union. One of the leading theorists and practitioners of the Scientific Management in Soviet Russia was Alexei Gastev. The Central Institute of Labour (Tsentralnyi Institut Truda, or TsIT), founded by Gastev in 1921 with Vladimir Lenin's support, was a veritable citadel of socialist Taylorism. Fascinated by Taylorism and Fordism, Gastev has led a popular movement for the “scientific organization of labor” (Nauchnaya Organizatsiya Truda, or NOT). Because of its emphasis on the cognitive components of labor, some scholars consider Gastev's NOT to represent a Marxian variant of cybernetics. As with the concept of 'Organoprojection' (1919) by Pavel Florensky, underlying Nikolai Bernstein and Gastev's approach, lay a powerful man-machine metaphor.

== Japan ==
W. Edwards Deming (1900–1993) brought the efficiency movement to Japan after World War II, teaching top management how to improve design (and thus service), product quality, testing and sales (the last through global markets), especially using statistical methods. Deming then brought his methods back to the U.S. in the form of quality control called continuous improvement process.

== General and cited references ==
=== Secondary sources ===
- Alexander, Jennifer K. The Mantra of Efficiency: From Waterwheel to Social Control, (2008), international perspective excerpt and text search
- Bruce, Kyle, and Chris Nyland. "Scientific Management, Institutionalism, and Business Stabilization: 1903–1923," Journal of Economic Issues Vol. 35, No. 4 (Dec., 2001), pp. 955–978. JSTOR 4227725.
- Chandler, Alfred D. Jr. The Visible Hand: The Managerial Revolution in American Business (1977)
- Fry, Brian R. (1989). Mastering Public Administration: From Max Weber to Dwight Waldo. Archived from the original on 2012-09-23 – via Questia.
- Hays, Samuel P. Conservation and the Gospel of Efficiency: The Progressive Conservation Movement 1890–1920 (1959).
- Haber, Samuel. Efficiency and Uplift: Scientific Management in the Progressive Era, 1890–1920 (1964)
- Hawley, Ellis W. "Herbert Hoover, the Commerce Secretariat, and the vision of the 'Associative State'." Journal of American History, (1974) 61: 116–140. JSTOR pss/1918256.
- Jensen, Richard. "Democracy, Republicanism and Efficiency: The Values of American Politics, 1885–1930," in Byron Shafer and Anthony Badger, eds, Contesting Democracy: Substance and Structure in American Political History, 1775–2000 (U of Kansas Press, 2001) pp 149–180; online version
- Jordan, John M. Machine-Age Ideology: Social Engineering and American Liberalism, 1911–1939 (1994).
- Kanigel, Robert. The One Best Way: Frederick Winslow Taylor and the Enigma of Efficiency. (Penguin, 1997).
- Knoedler; Janet T. "Veblen and Technical Efficiency," Journal of Economic Issues, Vol. 31, 1997
- Knoll, Michael: From Kidd to Dewey: The Origin and Meaning of Social Efficiency. Journal of Curriculum Studies 41 (June 2009), No. 3, pp. 361–391.
- Lamoreaux, Naomi and Daniel M. G. Raft eds. Coordination and Information: Historical Perspectives on the Organization of Enterprise University of Chicago Press, 1995
- Lee, Mordecai. Bureaus of Efficiency: Reforming Local Government in the Progressive Era (Marquette University Press, 2008) ISBN 978-0-87462-081-8
- Merkle, Judith A. Management and Ideology: The Legacy of the International Scientific Management Movement (1980)
- Nelson, Daniel. Frederick W. Taylor and the Rise of Scientific Management (1980).
- Nelson, Daniel. Managers and Workers: Origins of the Twentieth-Century Factory System in the United States, 1880–1920 2nd ed. (1995).
- Noble, David F. America by Design (1979).
- Nolan, Mary. Visions of Modernity: American Business and the Modernization of Germany (1995)
- Nolan, Mary. "Housework Made Easy: The Taylorized Housewife in Weimar Germany's Rationalized Economy," Feminist Studies. (1975) Volume: 16. Issue: 3. pp 549+
- Searle, G. R. The quest for national efficiency: a study in British politics and political thought, 1899–1914 (1971)
- Stillman, Richard J. II (1998). Creating the American State: The Moral Reformers and the Modern Administrative World They Made. Archived from the original on 2012-11-03 – via Questia.

=== Primary sources ===
- Dewey, Melville. "Efficiency Society" Encyclopedia Americana (1918)online vol 9 p 720
- Emerson, Harrington, "Efficiency Engineering" Encyclopedia Americana (1918) online vol 9 pp 714–20
- Taylor, Frederick Winslow Principles of Scientific Management (1913) online edition
- Taylor, Frederick Winslow. Scientific Management: Early Sociology of Management and Organizations (2003), reprints Shop Management (1903), The Principles of Scientific Management (1911) and Testimony Before the Special House Committee (1912).
- White, Arnold. Efficiency and empire (1901) online edition, influential study regarding the British Empire
