= Society for Advancement of Management =

Professional management society

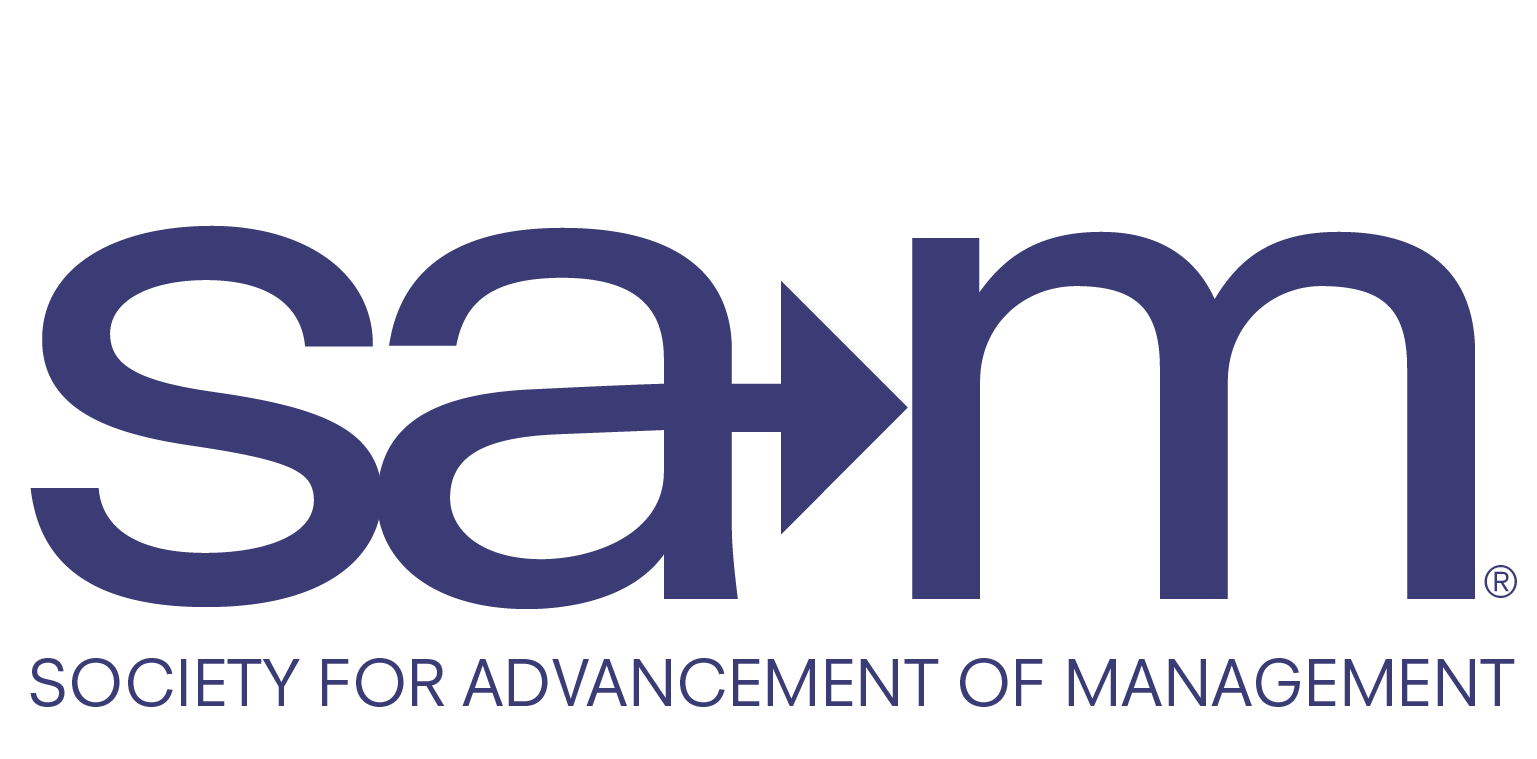
- Nickname: SAM
- Predecessor: Taylor Society, Society of Industrial Engineers, Industrial Methods Society
- Merged into: 1936
- Formation: November 11, 1912
- Founded at: Hotel Astor
- Headquarters: Marshall University
- Location: The Villages
- President: Henry "Hank" Johnson
- Executive Director: Patrick Endicott
- Website: www.samnational.org

The Society for the Advancement of Management, commonly known as SAM, is the oldest among professional management societies. On November 11, 1910 colleagues of Frederick W. Taylor met at the New York Athletic Club to discuss and promote the principles of 'scientific management'.

Following two years of discussion groups and informal meetings the group came together and formed the Taylor Society on November 7, 1912.

In 1936 the Taylor Society merged with the Society of Industrial Engineers and new organization undertook the new name. To date the Society is the world's oldest professional management society.

== Society for Advancement of Management ==
In 1936 the Taylor Society merged with the Society of Industrial Engineers forming the Society for Advancement of Management (SAM). International presidents of the society have been:

- 1936-1937: Ordway Tead
- 1937-1939: William H. Gesell
- 1939-1941: Myron H. Clark
- 1941-1942: Keith Louden
- 1942-1944: Percy S. Brown
- 1944-1946: Raymond R. Zimmerman
- 1946-1947: Harold B. Maynard
- 1947-1948: William L. McGrath
- 1948-1949: Charles C. James
- 1949-1951: Dillard E. Bird
- 1951-1952: Leon J. Dunn
- 1952-1953: Edward W. Jochim
- 1953-1954: Bruce Payne
- 1954-1955: George B. Estes
- 1955-1956: Frank F. Bradshaw
- 1956-1957: John B. Joynt
- 1957-1958: Homer E. Lunken
- 1958-1959: Phil Carroll
- 1959-1960: Dause L. Bibby
- 1960-1961: James E. Newsome
- 1961-1962: Robert B. Curry
- 1962-1963: Fred E. Harrel
- 1963-1964: Hezz Stringfield Jr.
- 1964-1965: William R. Divine
- 1965-1966: Oliver J. Sizelove
- 1966-1967: Donald B. Miller
- 1967-1968: James L. Centner
- 1968-1969: David N. Wise
- 1969-1970: Jack E. Wiedemer
- 1970-1971: Carl W. Golgart
- 1971-1972: Owen A. Paul
- 1972-1973: Ernest T. Tierney
- 1973-1974: Warren G. Orr
- 1974-1975: James W. Bumbaugh
- 1975-1976: Hal J. Batten
- 1976-1977: W. H. Kirby Jr.
- 1977-1978: A. T. Kindling
- 1978-1979: James J. Rutherford
- 1979-1980: John S. McGuinness
- 1980-1981: Clifford J. Doubek
- 1981-1983: Tony Brown
- 1983-1986: Moustafa H. Abdelsamad
- 1986-1987: Thomas R. Greensmith
- 1987-1988: S. G. Fletcher
- 1989-1990: Milt Kuhn
- 1990-1991: Sick Scarchetti
- 1991-1992: G. Paul Keddy
- 1992-1993: Bill Sauser
- 1993-1994: Mac Banks
- 1994-1996: Ralph Foster
- 1996-2018: Moustafa H. Abdelsamad
- 2018-2019: Allen Frazier
- 2019-2021: Avinandan Mukherjee
- 2021-2023: Susan Elkins
- 2023-2025: Reza Kheirandish
- 2025-Present: Henry "Hank" Johnson

One of the main task of the Society for Advancement of Management was the recognition of achievements in the advancement of management. For that, the society had initiated an Award Program, which contained the Taylor Key Award, the Human Relations Award, the Gilbreth Medal, the Materials Handling Award, the Phil Carroll Advancement of Management Award, the Industrial Incentives Award, and finally The SAM Service Award Honor Society.

== Taylor Key Awards ==
Prominent winners of the Taylor Key Awards have been:

- Lawrence A. Appley, George W. Barnwell, Donald C. Burnham, Phil Carroll, Morris L. Cooke, Donald K. Davis, Ralph C. Davis, W. Edwards Deming, Henry S. Dennison, Hugo Diemer, M. A. Dittmer, Peter F. Drucker, H. P. Dutton, W. M. Gesell, King Hathaway, James L. Hayes, Herbert C. Hoover, Harry A. Hopf, John B. Joynt, Henry P. Kendall, Dexter S. Kimball. Axa S. Knowles, Harold Koontz, Harold B. Maynard, Robert S. McNamara, John F. Mee, Don G. Mitchell, Allan H. Mogensen, Frank Henry Neely, Kaichiro Nishino, Nobuo Noda, Harlow S. Person, Henning W. Prentis, F. J. Roethlisberger, Edward C. Schleh, Harold F. Smiddy, Brehon B. Somervell, J. Allyn Taylor, George T. Trundle Jr., Lyndall F. Urwick, and Robert B. Wolf.
