= Quebec Run Wild Area =

Forested area in Pennsylvania, US

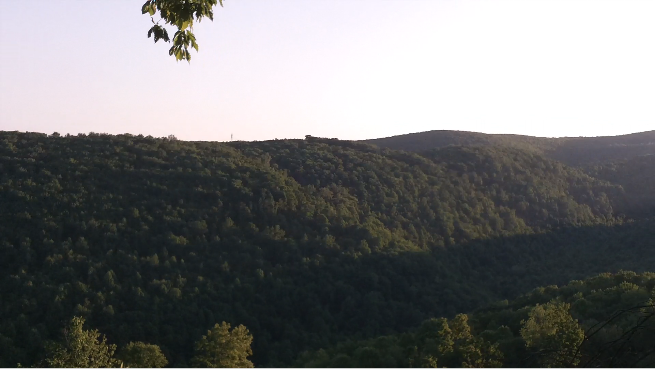

- Location within Pennsylvania
- Location: Fayette County, Pennsylvania, Pennsylvania, United States
- Coordinates: 39°45′30″N 79°40′59″W
- Area: 7,441 acres (30.11 km^{2})
- Elevation: 2,021 ft (616 m)
- Established: 2004
- Governing body: Pennsylvania Department of Conservation and Natural Resources

Quebec Run Wild Area is a 7,441-acre (3,011 ha) section of Forbes State Forest located in Fayette County, Pennsylvania just north of the Mason–Dixon line and the Pennsylvania border with West Virginia. Situated on the eastern slope of Chestnut Ridge, one of the westernmost ridges in the Appalachian Mountain Range, Quebec Run is heavily forested and contains several miles of maintained, interconnected trail. As is the case with all Pennsylvania state forest wild areas, no development of a permanent nature is permitted “in order to retain the undeveloped character of the area.” Quebec Run is the largest wild area without a road in southwestern Pennsylvania and serves as a destination for various outdoor activities including hiking, mountain biking, and cross-country skiing.

== History ==
While surveying the Mason–Dixon line in 1767, the English astronomer Charles Mason and a team of colonial surveyors ascended Chestnut Ridge and passed within three miles of the southern tip of Quebec Run. Mason described the area in his journal as "a wild of wildes: the laurel overgrown, the rocks gaping to swallow up, over whose deep mouths you may step. The whole is a deep melancholy appearance out of nature.” At this time Quebec Run was blanketed by old-growth forest dominated by American chestnut, eastern hemlock, oak, and maple.

Quebec Run Wild Area has since seen extensive logging activity. The area was most recently harvested between 1938 and 1940 by the Summit Lumber Co. of Uniontown. Evidence of this activity lingers to the present day, as seen by the remnants of old logging roads and the presence of brown sawdust piles. The vestiges of a building foundation situated along Mill Run marks the site of a saw mill which was built in the late 1930s or early 1940s.

A local legend exists about a group of Confederate soldiers who buried a large cache of gold, allegedly stolen from nearby Union banks during the Civil War, just north of the stream known as Quebec Run. While no evidence has been found to support this story, several excavation sites believed to be attempts to recover the gold still exist and are accessible from Hess Trail.

Quebec Run Wild Area has been managed as a wild area since 1972 but was not officially designated a Pennsylvania state forest wild area until 2004.

== Ecology, Flora & Fauna ==
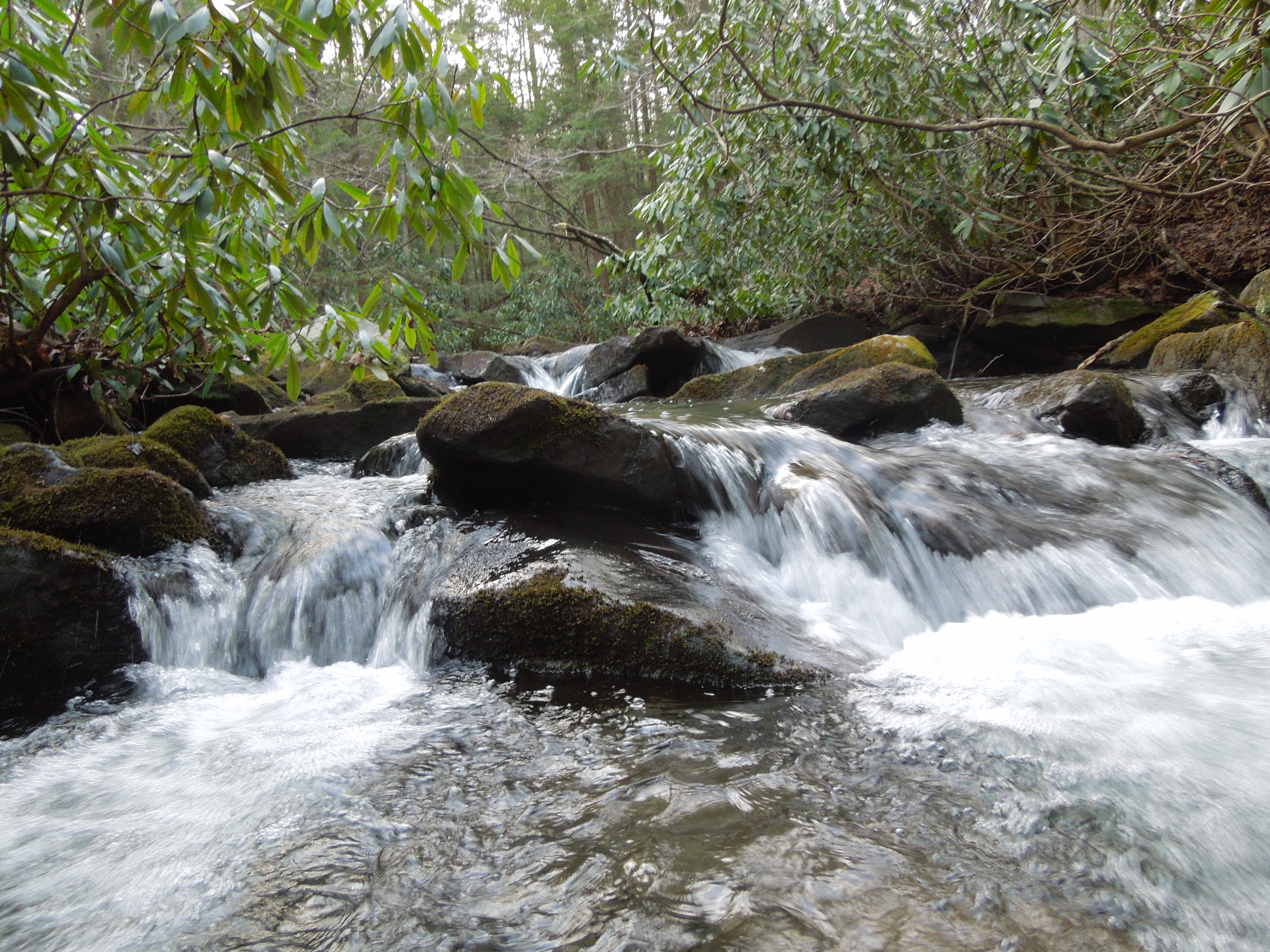
One of many waterfalls found along Quebec Run

Today Quebec Run Wild Area is a healthy third-growth forest in the Appalachian mixed mesophytic forests ecoregion. The forest canopy is composed of chestnut oak, northern red oak, shagbark hickory, red maple, sugar maple, black cherry, eastern hemlock, and white pine. Sprouts of American chestnut can be found due to blight in the early 20th century decimating the remaining mature trees. Mountain laurel, northern maidenhair fern, and hay-scented fern are common along the higher slopes and ridges, while wood nettle and rhododendron thickets line the banks of many streams. Wildlife includes white-tailed deer, beaver, chipmunks, skunk, wild turkey, red fox, coyote, timber rattlesnake, bobcat, and American black bear.

Several fast moving, rocky streams flow through the area, including Hess Run, Tebolt Run, and Quebec Run. These streams intersect many of the area's trails, and all are tributaries of Big Sandy Creek.

The limestone solutional cave known locally as Barton’s Cave lies within the upper reaches of the Quebec Run watershed. The cave is used by bats for hibernation and is frequently visited by cavers.

== Recreation ==
The Pennsylvania Department of Conservation and Natural Resources states that "a wild area is an extensive area, which the general public will be permitted to see, use and enjoy for such activities as hiking, hunting, and fishing." Hiking is therefore permitted on all trails in Quebec Run Wild Area, while cross-country skiing, mountain biking, and horseback riding are permitted on designated trails. A permit is required for camping only when staying in the same location for more than one night. As a state-designated wild area, bathrooms and rest areas are not available at Quebec Run. Patrons are advised to carry an adequate supply of drinking water and follow leave-no-trace principles.

=== Trails ===
The Quebec Run Natural Area includes a network of six interconnected and maintained hiking trails totaling more than 23 miles. The network includes the Miller Trail, Telbot Trail, Rankin Trail, Mill Run Trail, and Hess Trail, with a variety of difficulty levels and forest ecosystems.

== See also ==
- List of Pennsylvania state forest wild areas
- List of Pennsylvania state forests
