= Heinz Weihrich =

American academic

Heinz Weihrich is an author, management consultant, and a professor of Global Management and Administration at the University of San Francisco.

== Education ==
Weihrich has a PhD from UCLA and was a visiting scholar at, the University of California, Berkeley and Harvard University.

== Career ==
Weihrich is an author, management consultant, and a professor of Global Management and Administration at the University of San Francisco. He has authored more than 60 books and more than 100 articles. His books include the 11th edition of the classic Management: A Global Perspective. He also wrote Essentials of Management, which was formerly co-authored by Harold Koontz and Cyril O'Donnell and is a long-time best seller.

== Awards and honors ==
Following are Weihrich's awards and honors:

- Fellow of the International Academy of Management, the highest honor conferred by the international management movement
- Beta Gamma Sigma, business administration scholastic honorary society
- Sigma Iota Epsilon, an honorary and professional management fraternity
- Men of Achievement (Cambridge, England)
- Dictionary of International Biography
- Five Thousand Personalities of the World
- International Leaders in Achievement
