= Taylor Key =

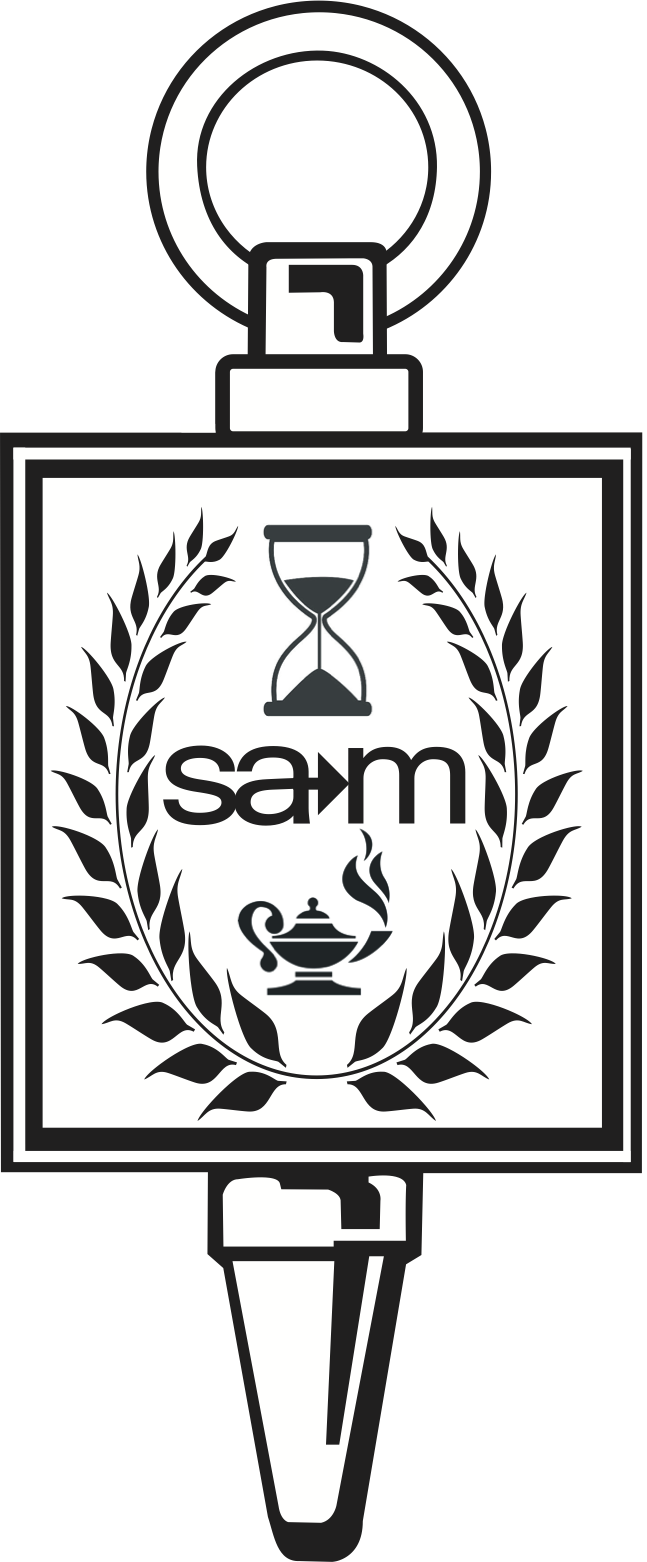
- Sponsored by: Society for Advancement of Management
- Date: 1937
- Website: www.samnational.org

The Taylor Key Award is one of the highest awards of the Society for Advancement of Management. This management awards is awarded annually to one or more persons for "the outstanding contribution to the advancement of the art and science of management as conceived by Frederick W. Taylor."

The Taylor Key has been awarded in cooperation with the American Management Association.

== Award winners ==
The award winners have been:

- 1937: George W. Barnwell, and George T. Trundle Jr.
- 1938: Asa A. Knowles, and Hugo Diemer
- 1939: Moritz A. Dittmer and William H. Gesell and
- 1940: Henry S. Dennison
- 1941: Morris L. Cooke
- 1942: King Hathaway
- 1943: Harlow S. Person
- 1944: Henry P. Kendall
- 1945: Henry P. Dutton
- 1946: Robert B. Wolf
- 1947: Harry Arthur Hopf
- 1948: Dexter S. Kimball
- 1949: Herbert C. Hoover
- 1950: Brehon B. Somervell
- 1951: No Award
- 1952: Harold F. Smiddy and Donald K. Davis
- 1954: Henning W. Prentis
- 1956: F. J. Roethlisberger
- 1958: Ralph C. Davis; Frank Henry Neely
- 1960: John B. Joynt
- 1961: Lawrence A. Appley
- 1963: Harold B. Maynard and Lyndall F. Urwick
- 1965: Phil Carroll
- 1966: Robert S. McNamara
- 1967: Peter F. Drucker
- 1968: Nobuo Noda
- 1971. Donald C. Burnham
- 1972: John F. Mee
- 1973: J. Allyn Taylor
- 1974: Harold Koontz
- 1980: Edward C. Schleh
- 1982: Allan H. Mogensen
- 1983: W. Edwards Deming
- 1998: Nobuo Shigenaga
- 2000: Moustafa H. Abdelsamad
- 2005: William I. Sauser, Jr.
- 2019: Edwin A. Fleishman

Other prominent winners of the Taylor Key Awards have been Don G. Mitchell, and Kaichiro Nishino.
