= George Barnwell =

George Barnwell may refer to:

- George Barnwell, the lead character in the play The London Merchant by George Lillo
- George W. Barnwell (1888–1958), American electrical engineer
