= James Keith Louden =

American industrial engineer (1905–1994)

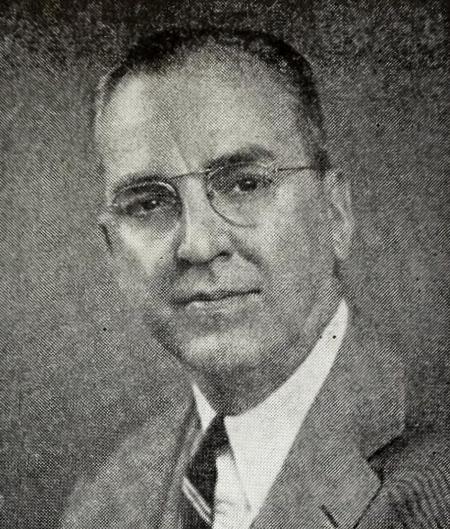
- J. Keith Loudon
- Born: March 4, 1905; Duquesne, Pennsylvania
- Died: August 12, 1994 (aged 89)
- Citizenship: American
- Education: Ohio State University
- Occupation: industrial engineer
- Employer(s): Fostoria Glass Company; Columbus Castings; Owens-Illinois; National Supply Company; Armstrong Cork Company; York International
- Notable credit(s): Gilbreth Medal, 1949; Worcester Reed Warner Medal, 1956

James Keith Louden (March 4, 1905 — August 12, 1994) was an American industrial engineer, business executive, and management author. He served as the 4th president of the Society for Advancement of Management in the year 1941-1942, and was the recipient of the 1949 Gilbreth Medal.

== Biography ==
=== Youth, education and early career ===
Louden was born in Duquesne, Pennsylvania in 1905, son of George T. Louden and Minnie M. (Zimmerman) Louden. He obtained his BSc in Business Administration from Ohio State University in 1928.

After his graduation in 1928 Louden started as industrial engineer with the Fostoria Glass Company until 1933. He was industrial engineer at the Buckeye Steel Castings Company from 1928 to 1933, and supervisor in the quality control department of Owens-Illinois Glass Company from 1936 to 1939.

=== Later career and honours ===
In 1939 Louden had joined the National Supply Company in Pittsburgh, where he was appointed Director of Industrial Engineering. From 1942 to 1947 he was production manager at the Armstrong Cork Company, and from 1947 to 1955 he served in several management positions at the York Corporation, which became in his days a division of the BorgWarner corporation. Next, from 1957 to 1961 he served in multiple executive functions at the Lebanon Steel Foundry in Lebanon, Pennsylvania. From 1971 to 1994 he was president of Corporate Director, Inc.

In the year 1941-1942 Louden served as president of the Society for Advancement of Management as successor of Myron Henry Clark, and was succeeded by Percy S. Brown. In the years 1968-1970 he served as president of the American Management Association as successor of Alexander Trowbridge, and was succeeded by James L. Hayes.

In 1949 he was awarded the annual Gilbreth Medal by the Society for the Advancement of Management. In 1956 he received the Worcester Reed Warner Medal of the American Society of Mechanical Engineers.

== Selected publications ==
- Louden, J. Keith, and J. Wayne Deegan. Wage incentives. Wiley, 1959.
- Joseph M. Juran and J. Keith Louden, The corporate director. 1966.
- Louden, J. Keith, and Jack Zusman. Effective director in action. Amacom, 1975.
- Louden, J. Keith. Managing at the top : roles and responsibilities of the chief executive. Amacom, 1977.
- Louden, J. Keith. The director: professional's guide to effective board work. Amacom, 1982.
