= Armstrong World Industries =

American industrial manufacturer

Armstrong World Industries, Inc.
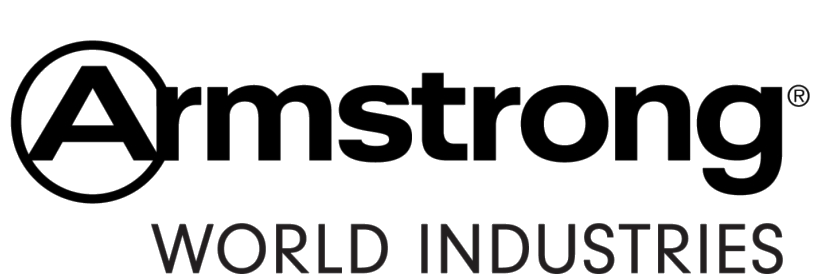
- Type: Public
- Traded as: NYSE: AWI; Russell 1000 Component; S&P 600 Component
- Industry: Construction Materials
- Founded: Lancaster, Pennsylvania, United States
- Headquarters: Lancaster, Pennsylvania, United States
- Key people: Mark Hershey, CEO
- Products: Ceilings
- Revenue: ▼US$936.9 Million (Fiscal Year Ended December 31, 2020)
- Operating income: ▼US$254.8 Million (Fiscal Year Ended December 31, 2020)
- Net income: ▼ –US$99.1 Million (Fiscal Year Ended December 31, 2020)
- Total assets: ▲US$1.718 Billion (Fiscal Year Ended December 31, 2020)
- Total equity: ▲US$450.9 Million (Fiscal Year Ended December 31, 2020)
- Number of employees: 4,200 (2019)
- Website: www.armstrong.com

Armstrong World Industries, Inc. is an international designer and manufacturer of wall and ceiling building materials based in Lancaster, Pennsylvania. As of 2014, AWI had 3,100 employees and a global manufacturing network of 17 facilities, down from 26, including nine plants dedicated to its WAVE joint venture, in 2012.

A Pennsylvania corporation incorporated in 1891, Armstrong filed for reorganization December 6, 2000 and it emerged from Chapter 11 reorganization on October 2, 2006. Its stock began trading on the New York Stock Exchange October 18, 2006. The Armstrong World Industries, Inc. Asbestos Personal Injury Settlement Trust in 2006 held approximately 66% of AWI's outstanding common shares.

Armstrong World Industries, Inc. and NPM Capital N.V. sold Tapijtfabriek H. Desseaux N.V. and its subsidiaries, the principal operating companies in Armstrong's European Textile and Sports Flooring business segment, to NPM Capital N.V. in April 2007. In 2022, AWI had $1.2 billion in revenue.

== History ==
=== 1860–1919 ===
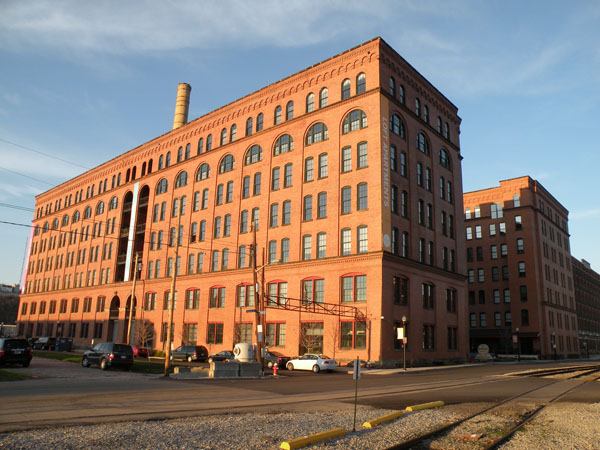
Former Armstrong Cork Company building in Pittsburgh, Pennsylvania (built circa 1901)

In 1860, Thomas M. Armstrong, the son of Scottish-Irish immigrants from Derry, joined with John D. Glass to open a one-room shop in Pittsburgh, Pennsylvania, carving bottle stoppers from cork by hand. Their first deliveries were made in a wheelbarrow. Armstrong was a business pioneer in some respects; he branded each cork he shipped as early as 1864, and soon was putting a written guarantee in each burlap bag of corks he shipped from his big, new factory. The company grew to be the largest cork supplier in the world by the 1890s. The company incorporated in 1891.

Cork began being displaced by other closures, but the company introduced insulating corkboard and brick. In 1906, two years before he died, Thomas Armstrong concluded that the solid foundation of the future was covered with linoleum, and construction began on a new factory in a cornfield at the edge of Lancaster, Pennsylvania. In 1909, Armstrong linoleum was first offered to the trade.

After corkboard, the logical move was to fiberboard, and then to ceiling board. Cork tile and linoleum led to vinyl flooring, then ceramic tile, laminate flooring, and carpeting.

In 1917, Armstrong Cork signed with the Batton Company advertising agency, a relationship that continues to this day through their corporate descendants.

=== 1920s-1990s ===
In the 1920s, the Armstrong Cork Products Company and Sherwin-Williams company were the largest industrial customers for hemp fiber.

In 1938, Armstrong bought Whitall Tatum, which had been one of the larger manufacturers of glass insulators for communications and power lines since entering that field in 1922. The Whitall Tatum name was phased out, first by removing "Co." from the molds, then replacing the "WT" logo with the Armstrong logo, and finally replacing the molds with ones bearing the Armstrong name. In April 1969, the business was sold to Kerr Glass Manufacturing Corporation. Kerr eventually moved insulator production from Millville to their Dunkirk, Indiana, factory in the mid-1970s, and production ceased by the end of the decade.

During World War II, Armstrong made 50-caliber round ammunition, wing tips for airplanes, cork sound insulation for submarines, and camouflage.

In 1952, Henning W. Prentis of Armstrong Cork Company and industrialists such as Alfred P. Sloan of General Motors, Frank W. Abrams of Standard Oil Company of New Jersey, and Henry Ford II of Ford Motor Company formed the Council for Financial Aid to Education, which increased corporate gifts to colleges from $24 million annually to $136 million annually over 10 years.

In 1958, Armstrong Cork Company created Armstrong Contracting and Supply Corporation. Armstrong Cork had done insulation contracting since the early 20th century, originally focusing on cork products. Gradually, greater emphasis was placed on high-temperature insulation. In 1969, this business was sold in a leveraged buyout to 31 existing and retired employees of the contracting company, which became Irex Corporation.

C.U.E., Inc. (from Custom Urethane Elastomers) started as the Polyurethane Division of Armstrong Cork in the 1960s. The Fluorocarbon Company of Anaheim, California, bought the division in 1972. On April 7, 1986, a group of seven employees acquired the division in a leveraged buyout.

In 1964, Armstrong bought Phoenix Chair Company, following up with Founders Furniture Company in 1965, Western Carolina Furniture Company in 1966, and both Thomasville Furniture and Caldwell Furniture in 1968. In the 1970s, they expanded with a low-end bedroom-furniture line. They bought Gilliam Furniture in 1986, bought and repurposed the former Stehle polyester factory in Carysbrook, Virginia, later that year, bought Westchester Group in 1987, and Gordon's in 1988, and made a major expansion to Thomasville that year. In 1995, Thomasville Furniture was sold to Interco (which became Furniture Brands International), a leading furniture manufacturer, with such brands as Broyhill and Lane.

In 1998, Armstrong acquired Triangle Pacific Corp., a leading manufacturer of hardwood flooring and kitchen/bathroom cabinets.

=== Asbestos trust and bankruptcy—2000-2006 ===
The company filed for reorganization December 6, 2000, with the federal bankruptcy court in Delaware for reorganization under Chapter 11 because pending asbestos injury claims appeared to exceed the value of the company, and were growing.

In 2002, Armstrong created a billion-dollar trust to resolve thousands of asbestos-related lawsuits filed against the firm. The trust was funded with a combination of stock and cash.

Armstrong World Industries, Inc. emerged from Chapter 11 reorganization on October 2, 2006. The Armstrong World Industries, Inc. Asbestos Personal Injury Settlement Trust in 2006 held approximately 66% of AWI's outstanding common shares. Armstrong's "Fourth Amended Plan of Reorganization, as Modified", dated February 21, 2006, and confirmed by U.S. District Court Judge Eduardo Robreno in August 2006, become effective October 2, 2006. The Plan included a comprehensive settlement resolving AWI's asbestos liability by establishing and funding a trust to compensate all current and future asbestos personal injury claimants. Its stock began trading on the New York Stock Exchange on October 18, 2006, under the ticker symbol AWI.

"In addition to resolving AWI’s asbestos liability, we used the time in Chapter 11 to restructure our flooring business to make it more competitive", AWI CEO Michael D. Lockhart said. "We made substantial improvements in our cost structure by closing several plants and streamlining our workforce in the U.S. We have also expanded capacity to manufacture wood flooring, broadened our product lines and improved product quality and customer service".

=== 2007-2024 ===
On February 15, 2007, Armstrong World Industries, Inc. announced that it was initiating a review of its strategic alternatives. On March 27, 2007, Armstrong World Industries, Inc. and NPM Capital N.V. agreed to sell Tapijtfabriek H. Desseaux N.V. and its subsidiaries, the principal operating companies in Armstrong's European Textile and Sports Flooring business segment, to NPM Capital N.V. The sale was finalized in April 2007. In 2009, Armstrong's annual net sales total was US$2.8 billion. Matthew Espe became AWI president and CEO in July 2010. In 2011, Armstrong's net sales were $2.86 billion, with operating income of $239.2 million. Armstrong Cabinets was sold by Armstrong World Industries to American Industrial Partners on October 31, 2012.

Armstrong spun off its flooring business into a new company, Armstrong Flooring (NYSE: AFI) on April 1, 2016. It began trading on the New York Stock Exchange with 3,700 employees and 17 manufacturing facilities in three countries. That day, Matthew Espe was succeeded as CEO of Armstrong World Industries by Vic Grizzle.

In 2020, Armstrong World Industries Inc. remained based in Lancaster, Pennsylvania. That February, it purchased group annuity contracts from Athene Annuity & Life Co. to transfer the majority of its U.S. pension plan liabilities. It transferred $1 billion in liabilities from the retirement income plan, affecting about 10,000 beneficiaries. In 2022, AWI had $1.2 billion in revenue. In 2024, it had 3,100 employees and 17 facilities, with its research lab in Manor Township. In January 2024, AWI acquired a stake in Overcast Innovations, a ceiling system designer in Seattle.

== Armstrong Manor ==
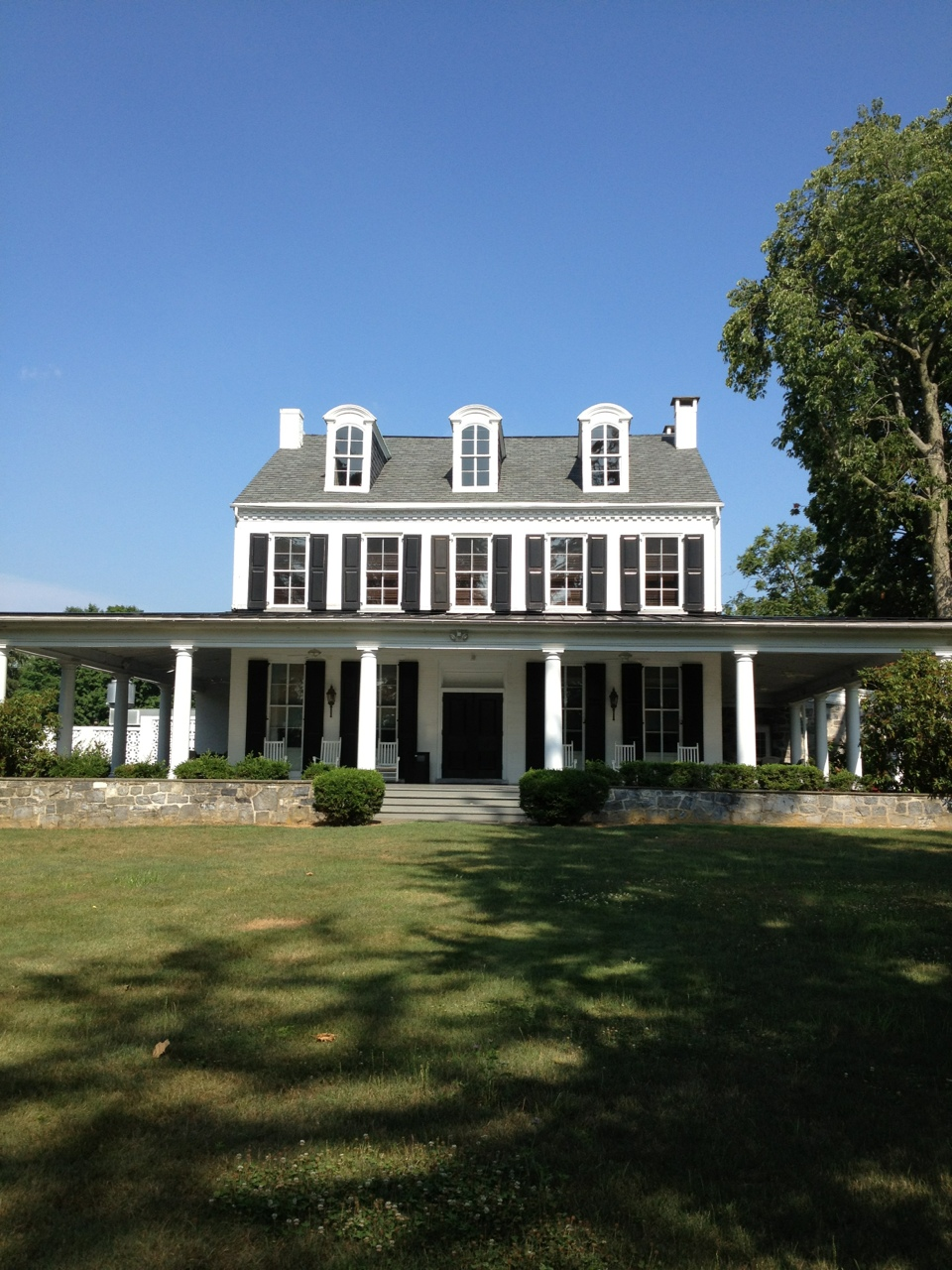
Formerly known as Armstrong Manor, the property is currently owned by Rodgers & Associates of Lancaster, Pennsylvania, and is now called The Manor.

The Armstrong Manor was originally purchased by Armstrong World Industries for use as a central location to house the company's young sales trainees. The home was later used in other capacities, such as meeting space and temporary housing for visiting employees. Armstrong owned the property from May 1920 to December 2011. The property is located in Lancaster, Pennsylvania.

The oldest part of Armstrong Manor, originally known as Bloomington Farm, was built in 1866 by David P. Locher, a prosperous local tanner, banker, and farmer. The 4-acre property remained a part of Locher's estate until April 9, 1906, when Grove Locher purchased the property for $21,000.

On May 29, 1920, the then Pittsburgh, Pennsylvania-based Armstrong Cork Company purchased the mansion from Grove Locher and his wife for $26,930. The company's second president, Charles D. Armstrong, was disturbed by the conditions in which his son, Dwight, and other new sales employees were living within various rented housing across Lancaster. C.D. Armstrong and his wife, Gertrude Virginia Ludden Armstrong, were also aware of the difficulties with the transition from campus life to industrial living, and desired a more comfortable living space for their sales trainees. Mr. and Mrs. Armstrong also wanted to have a suitable location for business meetings with visiting employees from other areas. The house was used as a living space for the sales trainees (all single men) during their 6-month training program at the Lancaster flooring plant. The company spent an additional $27,742.87 on renovations and renamed the property Armstrong Manor.

More recently, The Manor provided housing for visiting Armstrong employees and customers, and continued to fulfill its role as a meeting space. The property also had a facilities maintenance department (plumbers, electricians, and a mailroom) to support the property.

In November 2010, Armstrong World Industries announced its plan to close Armstrong Manor by the end of the year, citing that The Manor and the facilities department were no longer part of the “…core to being a building products manufacturer". Armstrong Manor was sold to Rodgers & Associates, a wealth management firm based in Lancaster, Pennsylvania, on December 15, 2011.

== Environmental record ==
Armstrong Holdings Inc. used to produce asbestos, either of two incombustible, chemical-resistant, fibrous mineral forms of impure magnesium silicate, used for fireproofing, electrical insulation, building materials, brake linings, and chemical filters. On November 16, 2000, it was reported that Armstrong Holdings Inc. was facing about 173,000 asbestos personal injury claims that would cost between $758.8 million and $1.36 billion through 2006. They filed bankruptcy due to these liabilities. Armstrong by 2008 had ceased producing asbestos, instead making vinyl and wood flooring and other interior furnishings.

== Manufacturing locations ==
ACProducts, Inc. was the seventh-largest manufacturer and distributor of cabinets in the United States as of 2013. The company offers six wood species for its stock and semicustom cabinets, including cherry, maple, oak, birch, plantation hardwood, and laminate/thermofoil, and serves over 3,000 customers through a network of 26 facilities consisting of ACP-branded showroom/selection centers, regional distribution centers, and warehouses, all in the United States. ACP is headquartered in The Colony, Texas with manufacturing operations in Thompsontown, Pennsylvania. Cabinet production facilities were owned by Armstrong World Industries but were under American Industrial Partners in 2015, with products being sold under the ACPI branding.

They produce ceiling products in the US in Hilliard, Ohio; Macon, Georgia; Marietta, Pennsylvania; Mobile, Alabama; Pensacola, Florida; St. Helens, Oregon and internationally in Rankweil, Austria; Shanghai, China; Stafford, England; Thornaby, England; Team Valley, England; Pontarlier, France; Münster, Germany; St. Gallen and Zurich, Switzerland, and Yelabuga, Russia.

All ceiling-grid components (tees, wall angle, etc.) are produced by WAVE, a joint venture with partner Worthington Industries of Columbus, Ohio. WAVE (Worthington Armstrong VEntures) has plants in Benton Harbor, Michigan; Henderson, Nevada; Aberdeen, Maryland; Shanghai, China; Prouvy, France; Team Valley, England, and Madrid, Spain.
