= Ralph Mosser Barnes =

American industrial engineer

- Born: October 17, 1900; Clifton Mills, West Virginia, U.S.
- Died: November 5, 1984 (aged 84); Santa Monica, California, U.S.
- Education: West Virginia University (BS, 1923); Cornell University (MS, 1924; PhD, 1933)
- Occupations: Industrial engineer, Educator
- Known for: Motion study, Work measurement, Micromotion analysis
- Awards: Gilbreth Medal (1941); ASME Fellow

Ralph Mosser Barnes (October 17, 1900 – November 5, 1984) was an American industrial engineer and Professor of Industrial Engineering at the University of Iowa, and the University of California, Los Angeles. He is known as author of the 1937 "Motion and Time Study," which would become standard work for industrial engineers for generations, and as recipient of the 1941 Gilbreth Medal.

== Biography ==
Born in Clifton Mills, West Virginia, Barnes was the son of John J. Barnes and Martha (Mosser) Barnes. He obtained his BSc and his MA in mechanical engineering from the West Virginia University, and his PhD from the Cornell University.

After his graduation in 1923 Barnes started his career at the U.S. Window Glass Co. in Morgantown, West Virginia for a year. In 1924–25 he was Assistant Engineer at Bausch & Lomb in Rochester, New York, working in Product Development. in 1925–26 he worked another year as Industrial Engineer at Gleason Corporation also in Rochester, New York.

In 1926 Barnes started his academic career as instructor at the University of Illinois. In 1928 he was appointed assistant Professor of Industrial Engineering at University of Iowa, working his way up to associated Professor of Industrial Engineering in 1930 and Professor of Industrial Engineering in 1934. In 1949 he moved to the University of California, Los Angeles, where he was Professor of Engineering and Production Management until his retirement in the late 1960s.

Barnes was awarded the Gilbreth Medal in 1941, the Industrial Incentive Award in 1951, and the Frank and Lillian Industrial Engineering Award after his retirement in 1969.

== Reception ==
Barnes is noted for his work in the fields of industrial engineering and management. The Work-Factor Council summarized:

His major contribution to management is the fundamental research he has conducted in industrial engineering. He has developed an extensive film library of motions and time-study applications useful to industry and educational films showing techniques and principles. During his 21-years of stay with the University of Iowa he developed the curriculum in industrial engineering and aided in expanding and enlarging course offerings; developed and equipped the University’s industrial-engineering laboratory; developed and directed the industrial-engineering research program; and originated and directed the University’s management course during 1939 – 1948.

== Selected publications ==
- Barnes, Ralph M. Industrial Engineering and Management, 1931.
- Barnes, Ralph M. Motion and time study. 1937. 3rd ed. 1949.
- Barnes, Ralph Mosser. Work methods manual. 1944.
- Barnes, Ralph M. Motion and Time Study Problems and Projects 1949.
- Barnes, Ralph Mosser. Work sampling. WC Brown Company, 1956.
