= Gilbreth Medal =

The Gilbreth Medal is named after Frank Bunker Gilbreth Sr. and Lillian Gilbreth and is presented in recognition of excellence in the field of motion, skill, and fatigue study. Originally awarded in 1931 by the Society of Industrial Engineers, the award continues to be presented following the organization's merger in 1936 with The Taylor Society under the new organization, The Society for Advancement of Management.

== Award winners ==
The award winners are:

- 1931 Dr. Lilian Gilbreth, Ph.D.
- 1933 President Herbert Hoover
- 1936 Ordway Tead
- 1937 Allan H. Mogensen
- 1938 Erwin Schell
- 1939 Joseph Wickham Roe
- 1940 David B. Porter
- 1941 Ralph Mosser Barnes
- 1942 Glenn L. Gardiner
- 1943 Elmer William Engstrom
- 1944 John A. Aldridge
- 1945 James Secor Perkins
- 1946 Harold Bright Maynard
- 1947 Don F. Copell
- 1948 Anne G. Shaw
- 1949 James Keith Louden
- 1950 Phil Carroll
- 1951 Ralph Presgrave
- 1952 William R. Mullee
- 1953 Marvin Everett Mundel
- 1954 Craig Lee Taylor
- 1955 Gustave J. Stegemerten
- 1956 Herbert F. Goodwin
- 1957 Harold G. Dunlap
- 1958 John L. Schwab (1892–1970)
- 1959 Gerald B. Bailey
- 1960 Leo M. Moore
- 1961 Gerald Nadler
- 1962 Richard Muther
- 1963 Lee Whitson
- 1964 Oliver. J. Sizelove
- 1965 Robert T. Livingston
- 1966 Daniel M. Braum
- 1968 Lucien A. Brouha
- 1969 Erwin Rudolph Tichauer
- 1971 Joseph H. Quick
- 1972 Henry Viscardi Jr.
- 1973 Richard M. Paget
- 1977 Arthur Spinanger
- 1981 Joseph M. Juran
- 1982 Mavin Mundel
- 1989 Wallace James Richardson
- 1991 Alan Pritsker
- 1996 Ernestine Gilbreth Carey
- 2001 David S. Ferguson
- 2002 Mary Ann Hainthaler
- 2004 Akira Takanka
- 2026 Elizabeth (Lima) Remillard
