= Span of control =

Term in business management

Span of control, also called span of management, is a term used in business management, particularly human resource management. The term refers to the number of direct reports a supervisor is responsible for (the number of people the supervisor supports).

== Overview ==
In simple words, the span of control means the manageable number of subordinates of a superior. The bigger the number of the subordinates a manager controls, the broader is her/his span of control.

In a hierarchical business organization of some time in the past it was not uncommon to see average spans of 1-to-4 or even less, i.e., one manager supervised four employees on average. In the 1980s, corporate leaders flattened many organizational structures, causing average spans to move closer to 1-to-10. That was made possible primarily by the development of inexpensive information technology. As information technology was developed capable of easing many middle manager tasks – tasks like collecting, manipulating, and presenting operational information – upper managers found they could hire fewer middle managers to do more work managing more subordinates for less money.

The current shift to self-directed cross-functional teams and other forms of non-hierarchical structures have made the concept of span of control less important.

Theories about the optimum span of control go back to V. A. Graicunas. In 1933, he used assumptions about mental capacity and attention span to develop a set of practical heuristics. Lyndall Urwick (1956) developed a theory based on geographical dispersion and the need for face-to-face meetings. In spite of numerous attempts since then, no convincing theories have been presented. This is because the optimum span of control depends on numerous variables, including organizational structure, available technology, the functions being performed, and the competencies of the manager as well as staff. An alternative view is proposed by Elliott Jaques that a manager may have up to as many immediate subordinates that they can know personally in the sense that they can assess personal effectiveness.

== Factors considerable deciding span of control ==
These are the factors affecting span of control:

1. Geographical dispersion, if the branches of a business are widely dispersed, then the manager will find it difficult to supervise each of them, as such the span of control will be smaller.
2. Capability of employees: if employees are highly capable, need little supervision, and can be left on their own, e.g., Theory Y type of people, they need not be supervised closely as they are motivated and take initiative to work; as such, the span of control may be broader.
3. Capability of managers, an experienced manager with good understanding of the tasks, good knowledge of the workers and good relationships with the workers, will be able to supervise more workers
4. Value-add of the manager: a manager that is adding value by training and developing new skills in the workers will need a more narrow span of control than one who is focused only on performance management (this is the reverse of the capability of workers point above)
5. Similarity of task: if the tasks that the subordinates are performing are similar, then the span of control can be wider, as the manager can supervise them all at the same time.
6. Volume of other tasks: if the manager has other responsibilities, such as membership of committees, involvement in other projects, liaising with stakeholders, the number of direct reports will need to be smaller
7. Required administrative tasks: if the manager is required to have regular face-to-face meetings, complete appraisal and development plans, discuss remuneration benefits, write job descriptions and employment contracts, explain employment policy changes, and other administrative task:, span of control may be reduced.
8. Business process streamlining, effectiveness, and efficiency can reduce the span of control.

== Theoretical considerations ==
The first to develop a more general theory of management was Henry Fayol, who had gathered empirical experience during his time as general manager of a coal and steel company, the Commentary-Fourchambault Company. He was the first to add a managerial perspective to the problem of organizational governance. The rationale for defining a strict hierarchy of communication channels is found in the need for vertical integration of activities, imposed by management's need for control and information.

However, exercising control over activities performed by subordinates and monitoring their communication would inflict information overload to the nodes at the upper hierarchical levels, since all communication to other branches of the organizational structure would be routed through them. In addition, a larger number of subordinates also requires supervisors to monitor a high number of interactions below their own level; information overload and span of control are positively correlated.

Graicunas (Gulick and Urwick, 1937) distinguished three types of interactions – direct single relationships, cross-relationships, and direct group relationships – each of them contributing to the total amount of interactions within the organization. According to Graicunas, the number of possible interactions can be computed in the following way. Let n be the number of subordinates reporting to a supervisor. Then, the number of relationships of direct single type the supervisor could possibly engage into is

$$n.$$

The number of interactions between subordinates (cross relationships) that the supervisor has to monitor is

$$n (n - 1)$$

and the number of direct group relationships is

$$n (2^n / 2 - 1)$$

The sum of these three types of interactions is the number of potential relationships of a supervisor. Graicunas showed with these formulas that each additional subordinate increases the number of potential interactions significantly. It appears natural that no organization can afford to maintain a control structure of a dimension being required for implementing a scalar chain under the unity of command condition. Therefore, other mechanisms had to be found for dealing with the dilemma of maintaining managerial control, while keeping cost and time at a reasonable level, thus making the span of control a critical figure for the organization. Consequently, for a long time, finding the optimum span of control has been a major challenge to organization design. As Mackenzie (1978, p 121) describes it:

”One could argue that with larger spans, the costs of supervision would tend to be reduced, because a smaller percentage of the members of the organization are supervisors. On the other hand, if the span of control is too large, the supervisor may not have the capacity to supervise effectively such large numbers of immediate subordinates. Thus, there is a possible trade-off to be made in an attempt to balance these possibly opposing tendencies.”

Fayol proposed that subordinate employees should be allowed to communicate directly with each other, given that their superiors had agreed upon this procedure. This principle became known as Fayol's bridge.

The use of Fayol’s bridge resulted in a number of other aspects needing to be taken into consideration. In order to put this system to work, Taylor’s functional foremanship has to be abandoned, and unity of command needs to be established. At the same time, decision power is distributed to individuals on lower levels in the organization, and only decisions that exceed the pre-defined decision scope of an employee are referred upwards. This, in turn, strengthens the co-equality of authority and responsibility. Since a Fayol's bridge is not limited to a certain functional area within the organization, but can span over functional boundaries, e.g. from purchasing to manufacturing, it can be considered as a first attempt to create a horizontal integration of related activities under a certain level of self-management, an early business process.

Mackenzie and others (Massie 1965, Pugh et al., 1972) also noted that there is no generally applicable optimum span of control. There are instead several factors influencing the balance between the desired level of control and the manageability of the organization.

Firstly, it depends on the capabilities of the organizational members, managers and workers. It was assumed, that no manager would be capable of supervising more than 5-6 direct subordinates. However, this conclusion built on the assumption that the superior must actively monitor the work of all subordinates. Later on, this statement was diversified when Davis (1951) divided managerial work into two categories, one requiring the attention to physical work, the other one requiring mental activity. Depending on the type of supervision, a span of 3-8 subordinates for managers at higher levels was considered adequate, while first level supervisors, i.e. those supervising shop floor personnel could have up to 30 subordinates.

The neoclassical theorists have developed a different solution. They assumed that a considerable amount of decisions could be delegated to organizational members at lower organizational levels. This solution would be equivalent to the application of Fayol's bridge combined with the principle of employee initiative that he proposed. As a result, the need for supervision would be reduced from direct control to exception handling. According to this assumption, they considered the opportunity of having access to a supervising manager would be sufficient to satisfy the need for control in standard situations. Peter Drucker refers to this principle as the span of managerial responsibility.

== See also ==
- Combinatorial explosion in communication
- Interaction frequency
- Network theory
- Scientific management
- Social network
- Socionics

== Literature ==
- Davis, R.C. (1951), The fundamentals of top management, Harper, New York
- Entwisle, Doris R.; Walton, John (1961). "Observations on the Span of Control". Administrative Science Quarterly. 5 (4). JSTOR: 522. doi:10.2307/2390619. ISSN 0001-8392. JSTOR 2390619.
- Drucker, Peter (1954). The practice of management. New York: Perennial Library. ISBN 978-0-06-200544-1. OCLC 650894147.
- Gulick, Luther Halsey; Urwick, L., eds. (1937). "Papers on the science of administration". Internet Archive. Institute of Public Administration, New York.
- Koontz, H. (1966) "Making Theory Operational: The Span of Management", The Journal of Management Studies, Vol 3, 1966.
- Ouchi, W. and Dowling, J. (1974) "Defining Span of Control", Administrative Sciences Quarterly, Vol 19, 1974.
- Mackenzie, Kenneth D. (1978), Organizational Structures, AHM Publishing Corporation
- Massie, Joseph L. (1965), "Management Theory", in: March, James G., Handbook of Organizations, Rand McNally, Chicago
- Pugh, D.S, Hickson, D.J., Hinings, C.R., and Turner, C. (1972), "Dimensions of Organization Structure", in: Hall, Richard H. (ed.), The Formal Organization, Basic Books
- Urwick, L.E. (1956) "The Manager's span of control", Harvard Business Review, May/June 1956.
- Van Fleet, D. (1974) "Span of control: a review and restatement", Akron Business and Economic Review Winter 1974.
- Van Fleet, David D.; Bedeian, Arthur G. (1977). "A History of the Span of Management". Academy of Management Review. 2 (3). Academy of Management: 356–372. doi:10.5465/amr.1977.4281795. ISSN 0363-7425.
- Jaques, Elliott (1998). Requisite organization : a total system for effective managerial organization and managerial leadership for the 21st century. Arlington, VA: Cason Hall. ISBN 978-1-886436-04-6. OCLC 36162684.
- Vrekhem, Fabiaan (2015). The disruptive competence : the journey to a sustainable business, from matter to meaning. Kalmthout: Compact Publishing. ISBN 978-94-91803-15-4. OCLC 934742983.
