= Armstrong Flooring =

American manufacturer of cork flooring products

- Company type: Public
- Traded as: NYSE: AFI
- Industry: Construction Materials
- Founded: Lancaster, Pennsylvania, United States
- Headquarters: Lancaster, Pennsylvania, United States
- Key people: Michel Vermette, President & CEO
- Products: Flooring
- Number of employees: 3,500 (August 2018)
- Website: www.armstrongflooring.com

Armstrong Flooring is a Pennsylvania corporation incorporated in 2016. It was spun off as an independent entity from Armstrong World Industries in April 2016. The company manufactures flooring products in the US in Beech Creek, Pennsylvania; Jackson, Mississippi; Kankakee, Illinois; Lancaster, Pennsylvania; South Gate, California; and Stillwater, Oklahoma; and internationally in Shanghai, China and Braeside, Victoria.

On November 16, 2018, Armstrong Flooring announced it would be selling its wood-flooring business to American Industrial Partners, a private-equity firm, for $100 million.

Hazel Dell Brown, chief interior designer of Armstrong Flooring, introduced a number of influential and popular floor coverings and other interior designs.

In 2022, the company entered into Chapter 11 bankruptcy, and its stock was delisted from the New York Stock Exchange. After selling all of its assets to AHF Products, the former holding company converted its Chapter 11 case to a Chapter 7 bankruptcy liquidation in April 2023.
