= Scotts Run (Big Sandy Creek tributary) =

Stream in Pennsylvania, USA

Scotts Run Tributary to Big Sandy Creek
- Location of Scotts Run mouth Scotts Run (Big Sandy Creek tributary) (the United States)

Location
- Country: United States
- State: Pennsylvania
- County: Fayette

Physical characteristics
- Source: Deadman Run divide
  - location: about 1 mile southwest of Mt. Washington, Pennsylvania
  - coordinates: 39°48′13″N 079°35′04″W
  - elevation: 1,850 ft (560 m)
- Mouth: Big Sandy Creek
  - location: about 3 miles north-northeast of Elliottsville, Pennsylvania
  - coordinates: 39°47′45″N 079°37′01″W
  - elevation: 1,598 ft (487 m)
- Length: 1.89 mi (3.04 km)
- Basin size: 1.28 square miles (3.3 km^{2})
- Discharge
  - location: Big Sandy Creek
  - average: 2.92 cu ft/s (0.083 m^{3}/s) at mouth with Big Sandy Creek

Basin features
- Progression: southeast
- River system: Monongahela River
- Tributaries
  - left: unnamed tributaries
  - right: unnamed tributaries
- Bridges: Scott Run Road (x5)

Scotts Run is a 1.89 mi (3.04 km) long 2nd order tributary to Big Sandy Creek in Fayette County, Pennsylvania, United States.

== Course ==
Scotts Run rises about 1 mile southwest of Mt. Washington, and then flows southwest to join Big Sandy Creek about 3 miles north-northeast of Elliottsville.

== Watershed ==
Scotts Run drains 1.28 square miles (3.3 km^{2}) of area, receives about 50.8 in/year of precipitation, has a wetness index of 302.71, and is about 96% forested.

== See also ==
- List of rivers of Pennsylvania
