= Nobuo Noda =

Japanese business scholar

Nobuo Noda (野田 信夫, Noda Nobuo; April 24, 1893 – 1993) was a prominent Japanese business scholar professor of management at the Seikei University and president of the Seikei University in Tokyo, known as one of Japan's longstanding leaders in the field of management theory, a specialist in productivity matters.

== Biography ==
=== Youth, education and early career ===
Noda was born in Nagano, Nagano in 1893. He graduated from Tokyo University in 1921 in literature and economics.

After his graduation in 1921 Noda joined Mitsubishi Electric, where he joined the Mitsubishi Economic Research Institute. In those early days at Mitsubishi, Noda made studies of the time and motion work of the Westinghouse Electric Company.

=== Further career and honours ===
In 1949 Noda was appointed deputy director of the Economic Stabilization Board. In the 1950s he was appointed professor of management at the Seikei University, served as president of this university in Tokyo, and was elected president of the Japanese Materials Management Association JMMC.

In 1963 Nobuo Noda was awarded the Taylor Key by the Society for Advancement of Management, in New York. Noda was considered in those days as "another early leader of Japan's management movement."

== Selected publications ==
- Noda Nobuo and Mori Goro, Romu kauri kindaika no jitsurei, (Examples of the modernization of labor administration). Tokyo: Daiyamondo-sha, 1954.
- Nobuo Noda, How Japan absorbed American Management Methods, Tokyo: Asian Productivity Organization, 1969.
