= James L. Hayes =

American economist

James L. (Jim) Hayes (1915 - May 16, 1989) was an American educator, dean of the School of Business Administration at Duquesne University, and former president of the American Management Association.

== Biography ==
Born in 1915, Hayes obtained his A.B. degree from St. Bernard's College in Rochester, New York, now St. Bernard's School of Theology and Ministry, and his M.A. in economics from St. Bonaventure University in 1937.

After his graduation he started his academic career at St. Bonaventure University as assistant professor in economics. By 1956 Hayes was Professor of Economics and chairman of the Department of Business Administration at St. Bonaventure University, and worked as Educational Consultant for Dresser Industries, Inc. in Dallas, Texas. He also taught at Rutgers University at the ABA Stonier Graduate School of Banking.

From 1959 to 1970 Hayes served as dean of the School of Business Administration at Duquesne University. From 1971 to 1981 he served as president and chief executive officer of the American Management Association as successor of James Keith Louden, and in 1981 he was succeeded by Thomas R. Horton. The American Management Association in those days had about 55 to 60.000 members, a staff between 700 and 800 people, and an annual budget over 51.000.000 dollar. For his contribution Hayes received a number of honorary degrees, including from the University of Cincinnati.

=== Family and death ===
Hayes was married with Pauline Jacobus, daughter of Genevieve and Camillo Jacobus, and they had a son and a daughter. He died at the Mount Sinai Hospital Medical Center in 1989, at the age of 74, of complications after heart surgery.

== Selected publications ==
- James L. Hayes. Handling the problem executive. 1964
- Hayes, James L. Management education in the 80's : international seminar : La Hulpe, Belgium, 24–26 February 1978, 1978.
- James L. Hayes. Memos for Management: Leadership. 1983.
- James L. Hayes. Memos for management: The manager's job. 1983.

Articles, a selection

- Hayes, J. L. "Teamwork." Manag. Rev (1975).
- Hayes, J. L. "Management from theory to practice." Executive housekeeper 25.6 (1978): 18–20.
- Hayes, James L. "A new look at managerial competence: the AMA model of worthy performance." Management Review 68.11 (1979): 2–3.
- Hayes, J. L. "The AMA model for superior performance: part II: how can I do a better job as a manager." Management Review (1980): 2–3.
- Hayes, J. L. "How competent manager work with people." Management Review 69.12 (1980): 2–3.
