= Henry C. Metcalf =

Dr. Henry Clayton Metcalf, Sr.
- Born: February 22, 1867; Warsaw, Illinois, U.S.
- Died: August 1942 (aged 75)
- Education: Harvard University; Humboldt University of Berlin
- Occupation: Organizational theorist

Henry Clayton Metcalf (February 22, 1867 – August 1942) was an early American organizational theorist, Professor of Political Science at Tufts College in Massachusetts, and Chairman of Tufts College. He is best known from his publications on management with Ordway Tead and Lyndall Urwick.

== Biography ==
Henry Metcalf was born in Warsaw, Illinois to Thomas B. and Mary A. (Chambers) Metcalf. After attending the University High School in Normal, Illinois, he went on to obtain an AB degree from Harvard University in 1894 and a PhD from the Humboldt University of Berlin in 1897.

In Autumn 1899 Metcalf was appointed as a college professor at Tufts College in Massachusetts, where he first worked with Mary Parker Follett in the early 1900s. In the 1910s he was also lecturer at Garland School of Homemaking in Boston, and at the New York Edison School. In 1914 he explained that he had spent several "summers in travel in Europe and the United States, studying methods of industry and employers' welfare institutions." In the 1910s he was also chairman of Tufts College, and until 1919 held the Cornelia M. Jackson Professorship of in Political Science at the Tufts' Department of Economics. In 1917 he took leave of absence from his duties at Tufts College and visited industrial plants and educational institutions.

In 1919 Metcalf moved New York, where he was appointed Professor of Economics at the New School for Social Research, and Director of the Bureau of Personnel Administration. The Bureau was founded in 1918 by Metcalf and offered courses in personnel administration, sponsored and conducted research on personnel administration, and sponsored annual conferences on topics relevant to the discipline. The 1925 conference featured Mary Parker Follett and the series of papers she presented have become milestones in management thought.

== Work ==
=== Personnel administration (1920) ===
Metcalf was co-author, with Ordway Tead, of Personnel administration: its principles and practice, generally considered to be the first college level textbook published on the discipline. Tead and Metcalf explained that the purpose of this book was "to set forth the principles and the best prevailing practice in the field of the administration of human relations in industry. It was addressed to employers, personnel executives and employment managers, and to students of personnel administration whether they are in schools of business administration or already in industry in some executive capacity." They hoped that it "will have value, also, for all - managers, workers, consumers - who are interested to advance right human relations in industry, and to secure a productivity which is due to willing human cooperation, interest and creative power."

The field of administrative activity covered by this book includes all those efforts usually included in personnel management, including; employment, health and safety, training, personnel research, service features and joint relations. Also, Tead and Metcalf sought to show the relationship of the personnel problems of each corporation to those of its industry as whole, by considering the activities of employers' associations and the dealings which they may have with organizations of workers (e.g., unions) on a district or national scale.

This book was highly influential in promoting personnel administration as a professional discipline and the personnel administrator as an important member of corporate management. Tead served as an adjunct professor of personnel management at Columbia University for decades and Metcalf founded the Bureau of Personnel Administration to provide continuing education and do research related to the discipline and promote it via seminars and conferences. Based on this work, jointly Metcalf and Tead were considered two of the most influential promoters of personnel administration of the 1920s.

== Publications ==
- Metcalf, Henry C. Industrial and social justice; trial outline and bibliography. 1912.
- Tead, Ordway, and Henry Clayton Metcalf. Personnel administration: its principles and practice. No. 18. McGraw-Hill Book Company, inc., 1920.
- Metcalf, Henry Clayton, ed. Business management as a profession. AW Shaw Company, 1927.
- Metcalf, Henry Clayton, ed. Business leadership. I. Pitman & sons, 1931.
- Tead, Ordway, and Henry Clayton Metcalf. Labor relations under the Recovery act. No. 41. Whittlesey House, 1933.
- Metcalf, Henry C., and Lyndall Urwick, eds. Dynamic administration: the collected papers of Mary Parker Follett. Vol. 3. Routledge, 1942/2003.
