= Charles C. James =

Charles Couch James (November 21, 1882 – September 30, 1957) was an American factory accountant in his early career and later consulting accountant at Stevenson, Jordan & Harrison, New York, known as 9th president of the Society for Advancement of Management in the year 1948–1949.

== Biography ==
=== Youth, education and early career ===
James was born in Lincoln, Illinois, in 1882, and started his working career after his high school graduation at the turn of the century. After a few years he became Assistant Superintendent of Construction at the St. Louis–San Francisco Railway on the line between St. Louis and Memphis. Here he received his first practical experience in the accounting and the operating of departments.

In 1909 James was appointed at the Interstate Commerce Commission at the staff of examiners of railroad accounts. In the next two decades he served at several large organizations, such as Southern Pacific Railroad, the Merchant Shipbuilding Corporation, Merritt-Chapman & Scott, Cramp-Morris Industrials, Inc., later part of Baldwin Locomotive Works, and the Westinghouse Electric Corporation.

=== Further career and other work ===
In 1931 James became associate at Counsellor, Stevenson, Jordan & Harrison, Inc., where by 1945 he was Associate Counsellor. He was a specialist in cost accounting and factory management.

Beside his consulting work James had been visiting lecturer at Columbia University and other New York Universities and at Pennsylvania State College. He was a delegate for the ASME to the Eighth International Management Congress at Stockholm.

James had been a longstanding member of the National Association of Accountants, present at annual conventions, active on chapter meetings, and contributor to the N.A.C.A. Bulletin. He served as President of the New York Chapter of the National Association of Accountants in 1945-46, In 1948 James had also joined the American Society of Mechanical Engineers (ASME). In 1948-49 he served as national president of the Society for Advancement of Management (SAM) as successor of William L. McGrath, and was succeeded by Dillard E. Bird.

=== Personal ===
James was married Mrs. Blanche M. James, and they had two sons, Leonard G. and Norman James, and a daughter, Louise M. James.

== Selected publications ==
- James, Charles C. "Depreciation and the Value of Public Utilities." The Journal of Accountancy (1916): 409-416.
- Charles C. James, "The Basis of the Flexible and the Variable Budget in an Expanding Economy," in: Advanced Management, Vol. XVII, No. 9, September 1952.
