= George T. Trundle Jr. =

George Thomas Trundle Jr. (September 26. 1884 – July 16, 1954) was an American engineer, President of The Trundle Engineering Company of Cleveland, Ohio, inventor and business theorist, known as recipient of the 1937 Taylor Key, one of the highest awards of the Society for Advancement of Management.

Trundle was born in Bakerton, West Virginia, in 1884, son of George T. Trundle Sr. and Georgianna Trundle. After attending grammar and high schools in his native state, in 1902 at the age of 18, he moved to Cleveland, where he started his career in the industry. By 1918 he was chief engineer of the American Multigraph Company. In the 1920s he founded the Trundle Engineering Company of Cleveland, where he served as president. Over the years he put several patents on his name, wrote several articles on business topics, and edited the 1948 volume Managerial control of business published by Wiley.

Trundle was awarded the Taylor Key in 1937 by the Society for Advancement of Management. In the early 1940s the Society initiated an award in his name; the George T. Trundle Jr. Trophy, awarded to an outstanding student branch.

== Selected publications ==
- Trundle, George T., (ed.) Managerial control of business. Wiley, 1948.

Articles, a selection

- Trundle, George T. "Production control." in: Handbook of business administration. McGraw-Hill, New York (1931).
- Trundle, George T. "Returning to the old job." Journal of Counseling & Development 23.1 (1944): 16–17.
- Trundle, G. T. Jr. "Your Inventory a Graveyard?." Factory Management and Maintenance 94.12 (1936): 45.

Patents, a selection

- Trundle, George T. "Chuck." U.S. Patent No. 1,044,299. 12 Nov. 1912.
- Trundle, George T. "Clip for locking type-lines." U.S. Patent No. 1,083,711. 6 Jan. 1914.
- Trundle, George T. "Feeding mechanism for cards, envelops, and similar articles." U.S. Patent No. 1,116,860. 10 Nov. 1914.
- Trundle, George T. Jr. "Milling-machine." U.S. Patent No. 1,216,018. 13 Feb. 1917.
- Trundle, George T. Jr. "Multiple-drilling machine." U.S. Patent No. 1,264,349. 30 Apr. 1918.
