= Big Sandy Creek (Cheat River tributary) =

Location
- Country: United States
- State: Pennsylvania, West Virginia
- Counties: Fayette PA, Preston WV

Physical characteristics
- Source: Chestnut Ridge, Fayette County, Pennsylvania
  - location: Fayette County, PA
  - coordinates: 39°51′01″N 79°39′15″W
  - elevation: 2,256 ft (688 m)
- Mouth: Cheat River
  - location: Jenkinsburg, WV
  - coordinates: 39°35′48″N 79°44′55″W
  - elevation: 616 ft (188 m)
- Discharge
  - location: Rockville, WV
  - average: 50 cu ft/s (1.4 m^{3}/s)
  - minimum: 4.1 cu ft/s (0.12 m^{3}/s)(1953)
  - maximum: 931 cu ft/s (26.4 m^{3}/s)(1912)

Basin features
- Progression: southeast
- River system: Monongahela River
- Tributaries
  - left: Braddock Run, Scotts Run, Stony Fork, Little Sandy Creek (Big Sandy Creek), Glade Run, Little Sandy Creek, Parker Run, Sovern Run, Joe Run
  - right: Chaney Run, McIntire Run, Quebec Run, Tebolt Run, Hazel Run, Laurel Run

Big Sandy Creek is a 31.3-mile-long (50.4 km) mountain stream which begins in Fayette County, Pennsylvania, and flows into Preston County, West Virginia, in the United States. The Big Sandy flows through Bruceton Mills and Rockville, West Virginia, before crashing down the mountainside and reaching its confluence with the Cheat River at the abandoned town of Jenkinsburg.

The Big Sandy is a popular whitewater kayaking run, a destination for paddlers from many states in the late winter and early spring. The most commonly run section is the Class-V Lower Big Sandy, from Rockville to Jenkinsburg, which contains two runnable waterfalls: Wonder Falls (Class IV) and Big Splat (Class 5.1).

== Recreation ==
=== Fishing ===
Multiple West Virginia stage record fish were caught along the Big Sandy Creek.

== See also ==
- List of rivers of Pennsylvania
- List of rivers of West Virginia
