= Unity of command =

Type of power structure

In military organisation, unity of command is the principle that subordinate members of a structure should all be responsible to a single commander.

== United States ==
The military of the United States considers unity of command as one of the twelve principles of joint operations:

Unity of command means that all forces operate under a single commander with the requisite authority to direct all forces employed in pursuit of a common purpose. During multinational operations and interagency coordination, unity of command may not be possible, but the requirement for unity of effort becomes paramount. Unity of effort—the coordination and cooperation toward common objectives, even if the participants are not necessarily part of the same command or organization—is the product of successful unified action.

== Military problems ==
When the principle of unity of command is violated problems quickly develop. An example occurred in Afghanistan in 2006 when Combined Forces Command-Afghanistan passed control of the ground fight to the International Security Assistance Force. This caused the operations to split between several unified commanders in charge of U.S. Central Command, the North Atlantic Treaty Organization, and the U.S. Special Operations Command, which caused significant operational problems.

== See also ==
- Chain of command, a clear command structure
- Civilian control of the military
- Command hierarchy
- Division of labor
- Parochialism
- Span of control
- Staff (military)
