= Dillard E. Bird =

American industrial engineer (1906–1990)

- Born: October 8, 1906; Covington, Kentucky
- Died: January 2, 1990 (aged 83)
- Education: B.A. MBA; Ph.D
- Alma mater: University of Cincinnati; Ohio State University
- Occupation: Businessman
- Spouse: Mary Carmichael Andrews
- Children: 1

Dillard Eugene Bird (October 8, 1906 – January 2, 1990) was an American industrial and consulting engineer, founder and President of Dillard E. Bird Associates, consultants to management in Cincinnati, Ohio. He was known as "veteran in the field of personnel administration," and as the 10th president of the Society for Advancement of Management from 1949 to 1951.

== Biography ==
=== Youth, education and early career ===
Bird was born in 1906 in Covington, Kentucky. He had obtained his AB from the University of Cincinnati in 1933 under Ralph C. Davis, and his MBA from the Ohio State University in 1938. In 1951 he also obtained his PhD at Ohio State with the thesis, entitled The relation of stabilization within the business organization to guarantee of work or wages.

After his graduation Bird had joined the Wharton School of the University of Pennsylvania faculty, where he was placement officer in 1937 and assistant director of Student Personnel by 1939. He also taught industrial management and industrial relations at Wharton School of Finance and Commerce, and was industry and government consultant in human relations.

=== Further career and other work ===
Around 1943 Bird founded his own firm, Dillard E. Bird Associates, consultants to management in Cincinnati, Ohio. Among others he was expert for the United States Office of the US High Commissioner for Germany in 1937, the National Wholesale Druggists' Association in 1949, and the SEE Foremanship Foundation in Dayton, Ohio in 1951.

One of his notable employees was the Carl Hartley Elliott, who was junior management consultant in 1947–48, and later professor and president of the Trine University. Since 1942 Bird also taught personnel administration and labor relations at the evening college of the University of Cincinnati.

Bird was the 10th president of the Society for Advancement of Management from 1949 to 1951. He was the successor of Charles C. James, and was succeeded by Leon J. Dunn.

=== Family ===
Dillard Eugene Bird married Mary Carmichael Andrews, daughter of James H. M. Andrews and Esther McKinley (Bender) Andrews. They had a son, Dillard Eugene Bird Jr. (1941–2015).

== Selected publications ==
- Dillard Eugene Bird. Foremanship Training, Development, Methods: A Case Study. Master thesis University of Cincinnati, 1933.
- Bird, Dillard Eugene. Building human relations. Cincinnati, 1948
- Dillard E. Bird. The Development of Management Associations in Germany. 1949.
- Dillard E. Bird. The relation of stabilization within the business organization to guarantee of work or wages. PhD thesis at Ohio State, 1951.
- Dillard Eugene Bird. The Guarantee of Work and Wages. Ohio State University, 1953. (614 pp.)

Articles, a selection

- Bird, Dillard E. Chapter operations manual. SEE Society for the Advancement of Management, 1948.
- Bird, Dillard E. Dillard E. Bird Associates, consultants to management. 1948.
- Bird, Dillard E. Survey of economic education. SEE Foremanship Foundation, Dayton, Ohio, 1951.
