= William H. Gesell =

American engineer and business executive

William H. Gesell (June 8, 1890 – June 6, 1956) was an American engineer, business executive and director of Lehn & Fink Products Corporation in Bloomfield, New Jersey, now Sterling Drug. He served as the 2nd president of the Society for Advancement of Management in the years 1937–1939.

== Biography ==
=== Youth and early career ===
Gesell was born in Jersey City, New Jersey in 1890, son of William Jacob Gesell and Laura (Thomas) Gesell. His father William J. Gesell (1865–1922) was one of the pioneers of Lehn & Fink, a New York wholesale druggists and manufacturing chemists. He had died suddenly after thirty-nine years at Lehn & Fink. Gesell attended Columbia University and the University of Michigan, where he graduated from in 1911.

After graduation he started his career as engineer with Lehn & Fink, Inc. In the late 1910s at Lehn & Fink, Inc. Gesell supervised the completion of a new plant in Hoboken, N. J., including supervision of the machinery and power plant. After its completion William H. Gesell has been appointed general manager of the Lehn & Fink plant.

=== Later career and honours ===
By 1924 at Lehn & Fink, Inc. Gesell was works manager, by 1931 Vice President, and by 1941 President of the company.

Gesell also served as president of the Society for Advancement of Management in the years 1937–1939 as successor of Ordway Tead, and was succeeded by Myron Henry Clark. In 1939 he was awarded the Taylor Key Award, one of the highest awards of the Society for Advancement of Management.

== Selected publications ==
- William H. Gesell. "Edible product and process of making the same." U.S. Patent No 1,475,574, 1923.
