= Command hierarchy =

Group of people who carry out orders based on the authority of others within the group

A command hierarchy or chain of command is a group of people who carry out orders based on others' authority within the group. Certain aspects of a command hierarchy tend to be similar, including rank, unity of command, and strict accountability. Command hierarchies are used in the military and other organizations. Systemic biases may arise in homogenous groups of command.

== Description ==
Within a group of people, a command hierarchy defines who carry out orders based on group members' authority. In sociology, command hierarchy is seen as the most visible element of a "power network". In this model, social capital is viewed as being mobilized in response to orders that move through the hierarchy leading to the phrase "command and control".

=== Features ===
Regardless of the degree of control or results achieved, and regardless of how the hierarchy is justified and rationalized, certain aspects of a command hierarchy tend to be similar:

- rank – especially military rank – "who outranks whom" in the power structure
- unity of command – each member of the hierarchy has one and only one superior, precluding the possibility of contradictory orders
- strict accountability – those who issue orders are responsible for the consequences, not those who carry them out (with the exception of illegal orders)
- strict feedback rules – complaints go up the hierarchy to those with power to deal with them, not down to those who do not have that power
- detailed rules for decision making – what criteria apply and when
- standardized language and terminology
- some ethics and key beliefs in common, usually enforced as early as recruiting and screening of recruits

== Examples ==
=== Military chain of command ===
In a military context, the chain of command is the line of authority and responsibility along which orders are passed within a military unit and between different units. In simpler terms, the chain of command is the succession of leaders through which command is exercised and executed. Orders are transmitted down the chain of command, from a responsible superior, such as a commissioned officer, to lower-ranked subordinate(s) who either execute the order personally or transmit it down the chain as appropriate, until it is received by those expected to execute it. "Command is exercised by virtue of office and the special assignment of members of the Armed Forces holding military rank who are eligible to exercise command."

In general, military personnel give orders only to those directly below them in the chain of command and receive orders only from those directly above them. A service member who has difficulty executing a duty or order and appeals for relief directly to an officer above his immediate commander in the chain of command is likely to be disciplined for not respecting the chain of command. Similarly, an officer is usually expected to give orders only to their direct subordinate(s), even if only to pass an order down to another service member lower in the chain of command than said subordinate.

The concept of chain of command also implies that higher rank alone does not entitle a higher-ranking service member to give commands to anyone of lower rank. For example, an officer of unit "A" does not directly command lower-ranking members of unit "B", and is generally expected to approach an officer of unit "B" if he requires action by members of that unit. The chain of command means that individual members take orders from only one superior and only give orders to a defined group of people immediately below them.

If an officer of unit "A" does give orders directly to a lower-ranked member of unit "B", it would be considered highly unusual (i.e., a faux pas, or extraordinary circumstances, such as a lack of time or inability to confer with the officer in command of unit "B") as officer "A" would be seen as subverting the authority of the officer of unit "B". Depending on the situation or the standard procedure of the military organization, the lower-ranked member being ordered may choose to carry out the order anyway, or advise that it has to be cleared with their own chain of command first, which in this example would be with officer "B". Refusal to carry out an order is almost always considered insubordination; the only exception usually allowed is if the order itself is illegal (i.e., the person carrying out the order would be committing an illegal act). (See superior orders.)

In addition, within combat units, line officers are in the chain of command, but staff officers in specialist fields (such as medical, dental, legal, supply, and chaplain) are not, except within their own specialty. For example, a medical officer in an infantry battalion would be responsible for the combat medics in that unit but would not be eligible to command the battalion or any of its subordinate units.

=== Command hierarchy in other organizations ===
The term chain of command is also used in a civilian management context describing comparable hierarchical structures of authority. Such structures are included in Fire Departments, Police Departments, and other organizations that have a paramilitary command or power structure.

Companies and non-military organizations often have command led by executives and upper management, with lesser authority delegated to employees in the lower ranks.

== See also ==
- Control (management)
- Command (military formation)
- Hierarchical organization
- Incident Command System
- Command and control
- Directive control
