= Chaney Run (Big Sandy Creek tributary) =

Stream in Pennsylvania, US

Chaney Run Tributary to Big Sandy Creek
- Location of Chaney Run mouth Chaney Run (Big Sandy Creek tributary) (the United States)

Location
- Country: United States
- State: Pennsylvania
- County: Fayette

Physical characteristics
- Source: Lick Run divide
  - location: about 1 mile south of Summit, Pennsylvania
  - coordinates: 39°50′29″N 079°39′42″W
  - elevation: 2,420 ft (740 m)
- Mouth: Big Sandy Creek
  - location: about 2.5 miles southwest of Elliottsville, Pennsylvania
  - coordinates: 39°48′09″N 079°37′06″W
  - elevation: 1,597 ft (487 m)
- Length: 3.94 mi (6.34 km)
- Basin size: 3.13 square miles (8.1 km^{2})
- Discharge
  - location: Big Sandy Creek
  - average: 7.31 cu ft/s (0.207 m^{3}/s) at mouth with Big Sandy Creek

Basin features
- Progression: southeast
- River system: Monongahela River
- Tributaries
  - left: unnamed tributaries
  - right: unnamed tributaries
- Bridges: Wharton Furnace Road (x5)

Chaney Run is a 3.54 mi (5.70 km) long 2nd order tributary to Big Sandy Creek in Fayette County, Pennsylvania.

== Course ==
Chaney Run rises about 1 mile south of Summit, Pennsylvania, and then flows southeast to join Big Sandy Creek about 2.5 miles southwest of Mt. Washington.

== Watershed ==
Chaney Run drains 3.13 square miles (8.1 km^{2}) of area, receives about 51.6 in/year of precipitation, has a wetness index of 314.82, and is about 96% forested.

== See also ==
- List of rivers of Pennsylvania
