= Tebolt Run =

Stream in Pennsylvania, USA

Tebolt Run Tributary to Big Sandy Creek
- Location of Tebolt Run mouth Tebolt Run (the United States)

Location
- Country: United States
- State: Pennsylvania
- County: Fayette

Physical characteristics
- Source: Laurel Run divide
  - location: about 1 mile northeast of Devies Mountain
  - coordinates: 39°44′33″N 079°42′58″W
  - elevation: 2,420 ft (740 m)
- Mouth: Big Sandy Creek
  - location: about 4 miles northwest of Clifton Mills, West Virginia
  - coordinates: 39°43′40″N 079°39′40″W
  - elevation: 1,549 ft (472 m)
- Length: 3.46 mi (5.57 km)
- Basin size: 2.80 square miles (7.3 km^{2})
- Discharge
  - location: Big Sandy Creek
  - average: 6.41 cu ft/s (0.182 m^{3}/s) at mouth with Big Sandy Creek

Basin features
- Progression: east-southeast
- River system: Monongahela River
- Tributaries
  - left: unnamed tributaries
  - right: unnamed tributaries
- Bridges: none

Tebolt Run is a 3.46 mi (5.57 km) long 2nd order tributary to Big Sandy Creek in Fayette County, Pennsylvania. This is the only stream of this name in the United States.

== Course ==
Tebolt Run rises about 1 mile northeast of Devies Mountain, and then flows east-southeast to join Big Sandy Creek about 4 miles northwest of Clifton Mills, West Virginia.

== Watershed ==
Tebolt Run drains 2.80 square miles (7.3 km^{2}) of area, receives about 50.5 in/year of precipitation, has a wetness index of 326.79, and is about 96% forested.

== See also ==
- List of rivers of Pennsylvania
