= Braddock Run (Big Sandy Creek tributary) =

Stream in Pennsylvania, USA

Braddock Run Tributary to Big Sandy Creek
- Location of Braddock Run mouth Braddock Run (Big Sandy Creek tributary) (the United States)

Location
- Country: United States
- State: Pennsylvania
- County: Fayette

Physical characteristics
- Source: Meadow Run divide
  - location: about 0.25 miles east of Chalk Hill, Pennsylvania
  - coordinates: 39°50′38″N 079°36′52″W
  - elevation: 1,855 ft (565 m)
- Mouth: Big Sandy Creek
  - location: about 2 miles south of Chalk Hill, Pennsylvania
  - coordinates: 39°49′20″N 079°37′00″W
  - elevation: 1,640 ft (500 m)
- Length: 1.73 mi (2.78 km)
- Basin size: 1.74 square miles (4.5 km^{2})
- Discharge
  - location: Big Sandy Creek
  - average: 3.26 cu ft/s (0.092 m^{3}/s) at mouth with Big Sandy Creek

Basin features
- Progression: southwest
- River system: Monongahela River
- Tributaries
  - left: unnamed tributaries
  - right: unnamed tributaries
- Bridges: US 40

Braddock Run is a 1.73 mi (2.78 km) long 2nd order tributary to Big Sandy Creek in Fayette County, Pennsylvania.

== Course ==
Braddock Run rises about 0.25 miles east of Chalk Hill, Pennsylvania, and then flows southwest to join Big Sandy Creek about 2 miles south of Chalk Hill.

== Watershed ==
Braddock Run drains 1.74 square miles (4.5 km^{2}) of area, receives about 52.4 in/year of precipitation, has a wetness index of 345.34, and is about 72% forested.

== See also ==
- List of rivers of Pennsylvania
