= Myron Henry Clark =

American chemical engineer

Myron Henry Clark (July 25, 1881 – August 30, 1953) was an American chemical engineer, management consultant, and director of the Labor-Management Institute at the University of Connecticut, known as long active proponent in labor-management affairs. He served as the 3rd president of the Society for Advancement of Management in the years 1939–1941.

== Biography ==
=== Education and early career ===
Clark was born in Bedford, Massachusetts in 1881, son of Charles Henry Clark and Abbie (Davis) Clark. After attending the Concord-Carlisle High School in Concord, Massachusetts, he obtained his BSc from the Massachusetts Institute of Technology in 1903.

After his graduation Clark joined the U. S. Rubber Co. in 1903. He worked his way up to general manager of the Footwear Division, and left in 1922. As head of the footwear division, he had introduced centralized hiring offices at boot and shoe plants.

Next, at the University of Connecticut he was one of the co-founders of the Labor-Management Institute, where he was long standing president until the early 1950s. One of his accomplishments was the successful establishing of a labor-management cooperation for U. S. Rubber and the Johns Manville Corp. In 1951 he retired from the University of Connecticut.

=== Further career and honours ===
In the 1930s Clark also had founded Myron Clark Associates, management consultants in Boston, where he was management consultant and president the next decennia. In the 1940s Clark became General Works Manager at the R. Wallace & Sons in Wallingford, Connecticut.

After turning 65 he kept working as management consultant. In 1952, at the age of 71, he was appointed director of the Productivity and Technical Assistance division of the Mutual Security Agency in Washington, D.C.

Clark had been member of the ASME since 1913. He served as president of the Society for Advancement of Management in the years 1939-1941 as successor of William H. Gesell, and was succeeded by Keith Louden.

== Selected publications ==
- M. H. Clark, J. P. Kottcamp, and Eli L. Oliver. Development and operation of joint management-labor committees, New York, July 22, 1942.
- Myron H. Clark. "Organizing a war production drive." in: Manufacturing Series, American Management Association. Nr. 135–150, 1942. p. 3
