= McIntire Run (Big Sandy Creek tributary) =

Stream in Pennsylvania, USA

McIntire Run Tributary to Big Sandy Creek
- Location of McIntire Run mouth McIntire Run (Big Sandy Creek tributary) (the United States)

Location
- Country: United States
- State: Pennsylvania
- County: Fayette

Physical characteristics
- Source: Lick Run divide
  - location: about 2 miles south of Summit, Pennsylvania
  - coordinates: 39°49′38″N 079°40′39″W
  - elevation: 2,180 ft (660 m)
- Mouth: Big Sandy Creek
  - location: about 3 miles north-northeast of Elliottsville, Pennsylvania
  - coordinates: 39°47′32″N 079°37′06″W
  - elevation: 1,597 ft (487 m)
- Length: 4.11 mi (6.61 km)
- Basin size: 3.27 square miles (8.5 km^{2})
- Discharge
  - location: Big Sandy Creek
  - average: 7.56 cu ft/s (0.214 m^{3}/s) at mouth with Big Sandy Creek

Basin features
- Progression: southeast
- River system: Monongahela River
- Tributaries
  - left: unnamed tributaries
  - right: unnamed tributaries
- Bridges: Shepherd Road, Wharton Furnace Road

McIntire Run is a 4.11 mi (6.61 km) long 2nd order tributary to Big Sandy Creek in Fayette County, Pennsylvania.

== Course ==
McIntire Run rises about 2 miles south of Summit, Pennsylvania, and then flows southeast to join Big Sandy Creek about 3 miles north-northeast of Elliottsville.

== Watershed ==
McIntire Run drains 3.27 square miles (8.5 km^{2}) of area, receives about 51.2 in/year of precipitation, has a wetness index of 313.93, and is about 95% forested.

== See also ==
- List of rivers of Pennsylvania
