= George W. Barnwell =

American electrical engineer

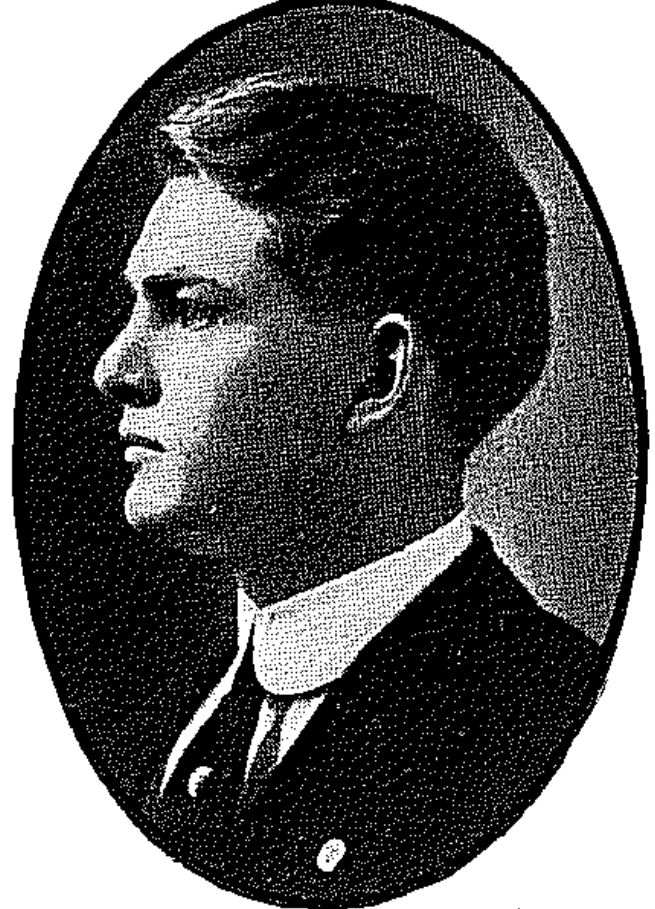
- Barnwell in 1909
- Born: George Winchester Barnwell; August 22, 1888; Hawkinsville, Georgia, U.S.
- Died: May 26, 1958 (aged 69)
- Spouse: Margaret K. Cromwell
- Awards: Taylor Key

Academic background
- Education: Georgia Institute of Technology (BSc); Massachusetts Institute of Technology (BSc); University of Pennsylvania (M.A.)
- Thesis: An investigation of the electric light and power requirements of a technical school (1914)

Academic work
- Discipline: Electrical engineering
- Institutions: Swarthmore College; Wharton School of the University of Pennsylvania; Stevens Institute of Technology
- Military career
- Allegiance: United States
- Branch: United States Army
- Rank: First lieutenant
- Unit: 75th Field Artillery Brigade
- War: World War I

George Winchester Barnwell (August 22, 1888 – May 26, 1958) was an American electrical engineer, Professor of Production Practice at the Stevens Institute of Technology, and recipient of the Taylor Key award in 1937, presented for conspicuous service.

== Biography ==
=== Youth, education and early career ===
Barnwell was born in Hawkinsville, Georgia in 1888, to Allard Barnwell and Nina (Graham) Barnwell. He obtained his BSc degree in Electrical Engineering at Georgia Institute of Technology in 1909. In 1914 he obtained another BSc degree in Electrical Engineering from Massachusetts Institute of Technology, with the thesis, entitled An investigation of the electric light and power requirements of a technical school.

After his graduation from Georgia Tech, Barwell had started his career in the industry. In Atlanta he worked for General Electric, in New Orleans for the Southern Oil Company, and in Boston for the Jackson & Moreland, construction engineering company. In World War I Barnwell served in the U.S. Army at the 75th Field Artillery Brigade, where he was commissioned a first lieutenant in August 1917.

From 1919 to 1921 Barnwell was an engineer at the Victor Talking Machine Company in Camden, New Jersey. In 1921 he was appointed an instructor in Electrical Engineering at Swarthmore College, and continued his studies obtained his M.A. in economics from the University of Pennsylvania in 1926.

=== Further career and honours ===
After his graduation from the University of Pennsylvania in 1926, Barwell was an associate professor at the Wharton School of the University of Pennsylvania. In 1929 he moved to the Stevens Institute of Technology in Hoboken, where he would spend the rest of his career until his retirement in June, 1948.

Barnwell started at the Stevens Institute of Technology as assistant Professor in Economics of Engineering, and was later in the 1930s on in the Professor of Production Practice. In 1941 he was also put in charge of the work of shop practice at the Stevens Institute of Technology.

In 1937 Barnwell was awarded the Taylor Key, one of the highest awards of the Society for Advancement of Management.

=== Personal ===
Barwell was married to Margaret K. (Cromwell) Barnwell (1895-1976). He died May 26, 1958, and was buried at the Beverly National Cemetery.

== Selected publications ==
- Barnwell, George W. An investigation of the electric light and power requirements of a technical school. Diss. Massachusetts Institute of Technology, Department of Electrical Engineering, 1914.
- Barnwell, G[eorge] W. Engineering economics and practice. Solutions to the university of the state of New York past examinations for professional engineers. pt. 3, group A. (C) May 1, 1939
- Barnwell, George W. New encyclopedia of machine shop practice; a guide to the principles and practice of machine shop procedure. 1941.

Articles, a selection

- Barnwell, George W. "Engineering Economics, Why? Where? What?," Proceedings, Society for the Promotion of Engineering Education (U.S.), Volume 43. 1935.
