= Lyndall Urwick =

British management consultant

Lyndall F. Urwick
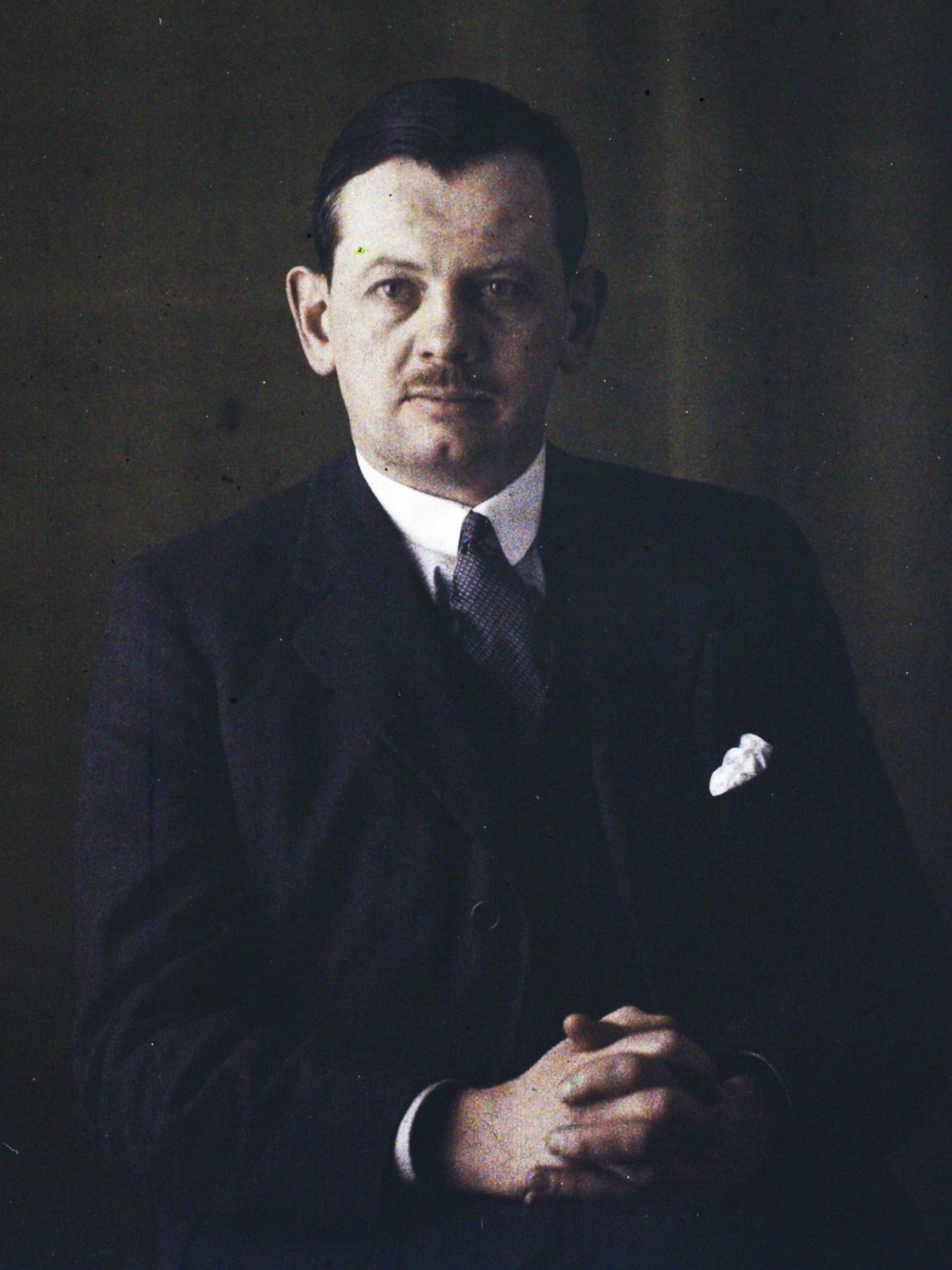
- 1930 Autochrome by Georges Chevalier
- Born: March 3, 1891
- Died: December 5, 1983 (aged 92)
- Occupations: Author, intellectual, and management consultant

Lyndall Fownes Urwick MC (3 March 1891 – 5 December 1983) was a British management consultant and business thinker. He is recognised for integrating the ideas of earlier theorists like Henri Fayol into a comprehensive theory of management administration. He wrote an influential book called The Elements of Business Administration, published in 1943. With Luther Gulick, he founded the academic journal Administrative Science Quarterly.

== Biography ==
=== Youth and military service ===
Urwick was born in Worcestershire, the son of a partner in Fownes Brothers, a long-established glove-making firm. He was educated at Boxgrove Primary School, Repton School and New College, Oxford, where he read History.

He saw active service in the trenches during the First World War, rising to the rank of Major, and being awarded the Military Cross. Though he did not himself attend the military Staff College at Camberley, his respect for military training would affect his outlook on management in later life.

=== Rowntree's ===
After the war, he joined his father's business of Fownes Brothers. He was then recruited by Seebohm Rowntree, head of the York chocolate company and progressive philanthropist. Urwick's role involved assisting the modernisation of the company, bringing to bear his own thinking, which had two main influences. One was the work of F.W. Taylor with its concept of scientific management, and the other, counterbalancing it in its emphasis on the humanity of management was Mary Parker Follett, for whom he had great admiration. He attended the second conference of the International Industrial Relations Institute held at Girton College, Cambridge in 1928.

Urwick's own prolific writings on management truly began in this period. At this time, Urwick, along with his colleague at Rowntree's, Oliver Sheldon, became active members of the Taylor Society.

=== International Management Institute ===
His growing reputation as a British thinker on management and administration won him appointment in 1928 as Director of the International Management Institute (ILO) in Geneva.

The Institute was short-lived, closing in 1933, but it provided Urwick the opportunity not only to lecture widely but to produce his books The Meaning of Rationalisation (1929) and The Management of Tomorrow (1933).

Urwick also produced and disseminated the first European study of Elton Mayo's research at the Hawthorne Works in Chicago while at the IMI.

It was also this time that he became particularly keen to promote the writings of Henri Fayol to an English audience.

=== Management consultancy ===
Having returned to Britain, in 1934 Urwick established, with John Orr of Bedaux Britain, a management consultancy named Urwick, Orr & Partners (UOP). UOP's slogan was Profit on Principle: A British Service for British Business in the application of the Principles of Direction and Control.

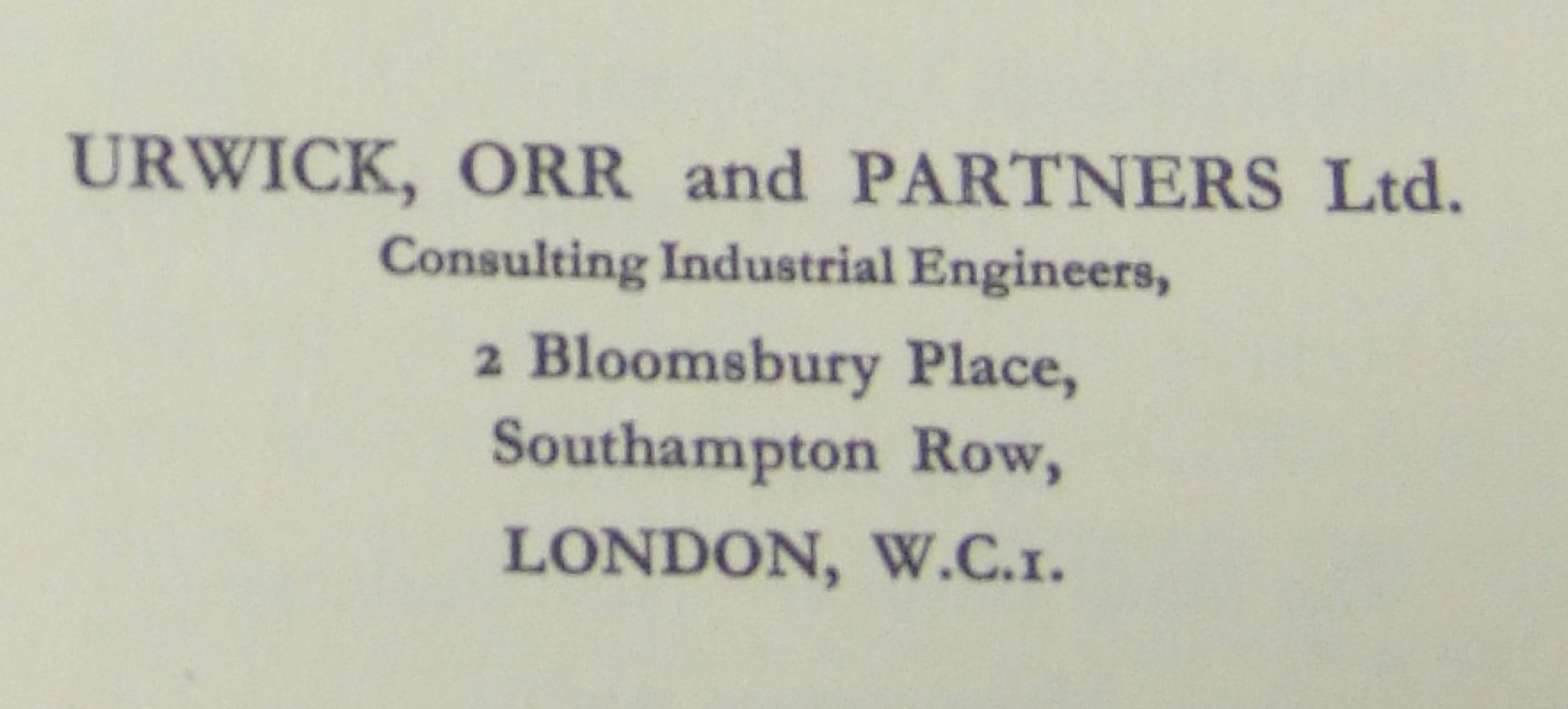
Urwick Orr & Partners (1934)

From the outset, UOP instituted a copy of the Bedaux System and Bedaux Unit, the Point System, in hundreds of factories and offices across Britain and further afield.

Orr left the consultancy in the 1940s, putting Urwick in effective control of the company in the postwar period. Along with AIC, P-E and PA Consulting, UOP came to be one of the 'Big Four' leading Western European consultancies in the 1950s.

A particularly notable UOP consultant was E.F.L. Brech, with whom Urwick wrote the Making of Scientific Management trilogy.

=== Later years ===
In the post-war period Urwick appeared on the lecturing circuit on both sides of the Atlantic, including on the BBC.

Urwick became a well-known enthusiast of management education and management history, and a public promoter of F.W. Taylor and scientific management. So much so that Harry Braverman attacked him in 1974's Labor and Monopoly Capital as the 'rhapsodic historian of the scientific management movement'.

In 1955 Urwick was awarded the Wallace Clark Award. In later years, Lyndall Urwick retired to Australia, where he died in 1983. His papers were donated to the Administrative Staff College, by then renamed Henley Management College.

== Work ==
=== Making of Scientific Management ===
In 1945, he made his most lasting contribution to management literature with the publication of his three-volume Making of Scientific Management. It was the first treatise to present a clear and focused discussion of the development and applications of management science. It included a comprehensive number of profiles of leading proponents of management theory, from early pioneers such as Charles Babbage and Frederick Winslow Taylor, to those such as Seebohm Rowntree and Mary Parker Follett who innovated and refined their concepts.

All aimed to bring '"adequate intelligence" to the control of the forces released by a mechanised economy' to bring the logical standards of science to bear on business practice. It also dealt with early contributions to understanding the scientific approach to control in industry. A long background of scientific management practices had previously been largely unknown before publication of these volumes. The study included a view of methods of control at the famous Boulton and Watt Foundry, of Robert Owen's approach to personnel management, and of commercial management training.

=== The Manager's Span of Control ===
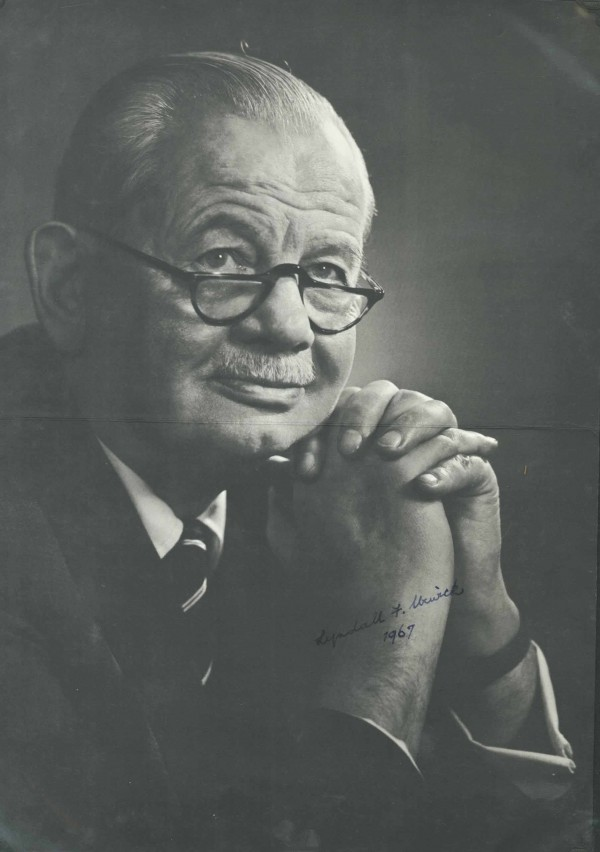
Urwick in 1967

Lyndall Urwick was the first writer to apply the concept of span of control formally to business. Urwick asserted that the reduction of less important daily duties is essential for enhancing the personal touch that makes a business executive an effective leader. Using the work of General Sir Ian Standish Monteith Hamilton, Urwick maintained that limiting the number of subordinates reporting to an executive ( i.e. restricting the span of control) can do the following: improve executive effectiveness; reduce pressure, inefficiency and incompetence; produce better employee co-operation; and build morale and sense of unity within the organisation.

After a conversation with Urwick, A.V. Graicunas wrote an article, "Relationship in Organization", that was published in 1933 in the Bulletin of the International Management Institute. In this article, Graicunas noted that superiors must be cognizant of not only their direct relationships of their subordinates, but the cross relationships between subordinates and different subgroupings. Graicunas went on to apply a mathematical formula to show that each increase of direct relationships by 1 represented a 25% increase in power to delegate and more than a 100% increase in the burden of supervision and co-ordination. Urwick expanded on these findings to provide the recommendation that "no superior can supervise directly the work of more than five or, at the most, six subordinates whose work interlocks".

Urwick’s application of the span of control to business was not met without criticism. Herbert A. Simon questioned the theoretical soundness of the concept and suggested that a restricted span of control would produce excessive red tape. Urwick countered this criticism by noting that if span of control is appropriately implemented this will not occur. Burleigh B. Gardner criticised span of control as prohibiting democratic participation within the organisation. Urwick countered this criticism by noting that too wide a span of control reduces democracy because it prevents subordinates from having meaningful interaction with superiors. Additionally, other scholars criticised the principle as incorrect because of examples of efficient organisations that have an expanded span of control. Urwick addressed this criticism by noting that in these situations subordinates' work did not overlock. Therefore, these organisations were exceptions.

Reasons that leaders ignore the principle of span of control were also addressed by Urwick. Three primary "human failings" are described including: the failure of business to distinguish rank or status from function; cost-consciousness of businessmen; and the cherishing of the stereotype of the efficient executive. Urwick noted that effective leaders will overcome these failings and begin to lead and not dominate his or her subordinates.

=== Management education in Britain ===
In the 1940s and 1950s Urwick's intellectual interests continued. An increasing concern of his was the lack of management education in Britain. He was involved in the very earliest discussions for what would become, in 1948, the Administrative Staff College. His own view of the education required did not accord with the College as it was finally established, which concentrated on a three-month course for established executives. He would have preferred something much closer to the model of the American business school, involving a longer course and aimed at pre-experience students. It was a continuing frustration for Urwick that England's two ancient universities failed to promote management education.

== Publications ==
Books:

- Urwick, Lyndall Fownes. Organization as a technical problem. 1933.
- Metcalf, Henry C., and Lyndall Urwick, eds. Dynamic administration: the collected papers of Mary Parker Follett. Vol. 3. Routledge, 1942/2003.
- Urwick, Lyndall Fownes. The elements of administration. Harper & brothers, 1944.
- Urwick, Lyndall Fownes. Notes on the Theory of Organization. New York: American Management Association, 1952.
- Urwick, Lyndall Fownes and Edward Brech. The making of scientific management. University of Chicago Press Economics Books, 1954/1994.
- Urwick, Lyndall Fownes. The Pattern of Management. University of Minnesota Press, 1956.
- Urwick, Lyndall Fownes. The Golden Book of Management: A Historical Record of the Life and Work of Seventy Pioneers, 1956
- Gulick, Luther, and Lyndall Urwick, eds. Papers on the Science of Administration. Routledge, 2012.

About Urwick

- Brech, Edward; Thomson, Andrew; Wilson, John F. Lyndall Urwick, Management Pioneer: A Biography. New York: Oxford University Press, 2010. ISBN 0-19-954196-5; ISBN 978-0-19-954196-6
