= Cyril J. O'Donnell =

Cyril O'Donnell (December 1900 – February 16, 1976) was a professor and teacher of management at the University of California at Los Angeles. He consulted on operations management topics for corporations such as Hughes Aircraft, as well as the government of Jamaica. He was a co-author of the book Principles of Management with Harold Koontz which sold more than two million copies worldwide with translations in 15 languages.

Cyril O'Donnell was a pioneer along with others such as George Terry, Harold Koontz and Ralph Davis. All of which published management textbooks in the 1950s that defined management as a process consisting of a set of interdependent functions. These and several other management experts became identified with what came to be known as the process school of management.

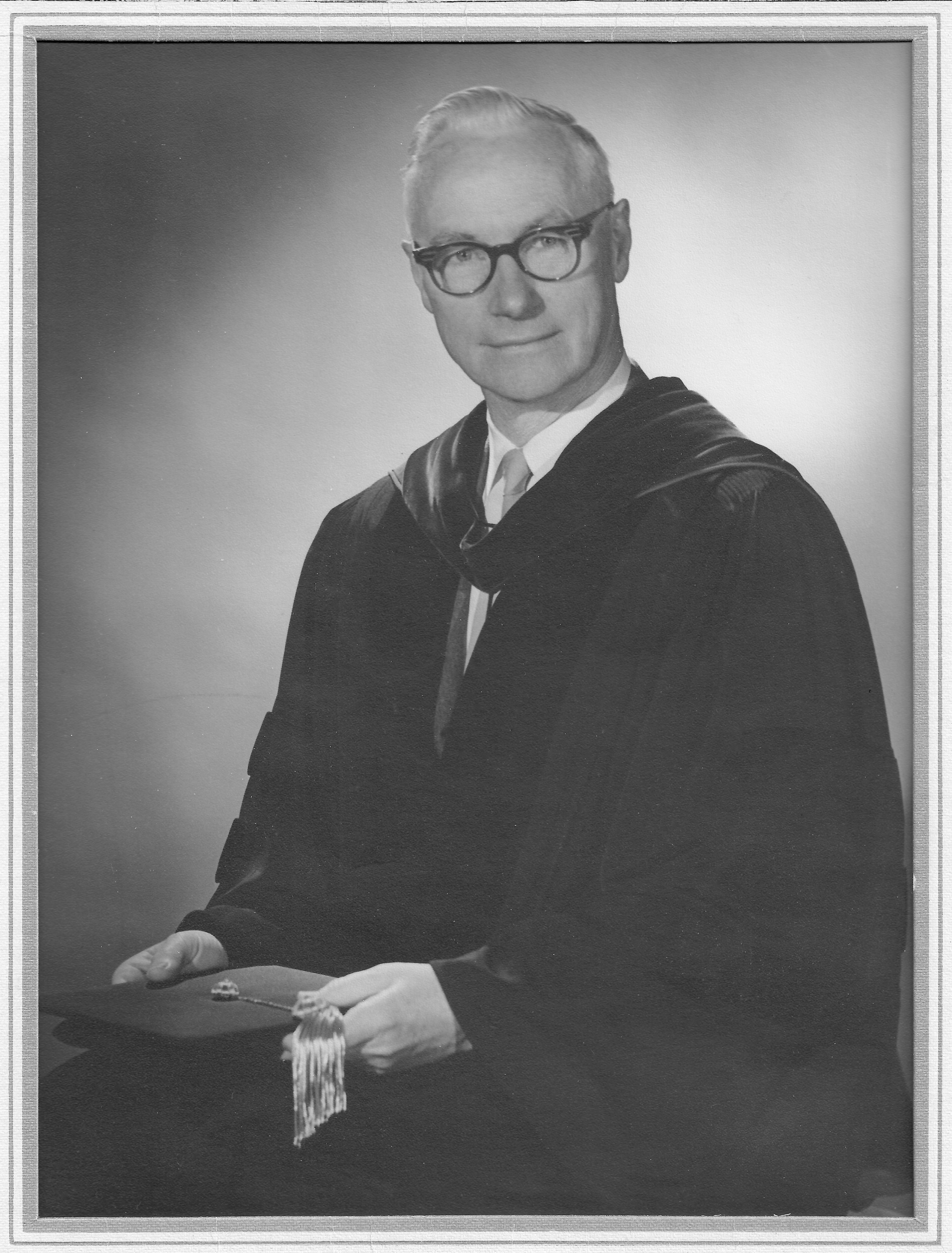
Graduation photo of Cyril J. O'Donnell upon receiving his Ph. D in 1944 from the University of Chicago.

Professor O'Donnell was born in Lincoln, Nebraska in December 1900. He grew up in rural Alberta, Canada, and attended the University of Alberta, from which he received the Bachelor of Commerce degree in 1924 and the Master of Arts degree in 1926. He returned to the United States and in 1930 was appointed chairman of the Department of Economics at DePaul University. In 1944 Professor O'Donnell received his Ph.D. from the University of Chicago.

In 1948, Cyril joined the faculty at UCLA, where he taught business and management to undergraduate, graduate and business executives. He also served as chairman of the board of control for UCLA. He retired in 1968 and continued to consult for various corporations and entities.

Cyril J. O'Donnell died at home in Bel Air, California on February 16, 1976, at the age of seventy-six.
