= Ordway Tead =

Ordway Tead (10 September 1891 – November 1973) was an American organizational theorist, adjunct professor of industrial relations at Columbia University, chair of the New York Board of Higher Education, first president of the Society for Advancement of Management (SAM), editor and publishing executive, and prolific author on personnel administration and labor relations, organizational management, higher education, and political science.

== Personal ==
Tead was born in Somerville, Massachusetts the son of Edward Sampson (1852-1919) and Louise Moore Ordway (1858-1935) Tead. In 1915 Tead married Clara Alberta Murphy (1891-1980), long term president of Briarcliff College and they had one daughter, Diana Tead Michaelis (1925 1981) who was an award-winning documentary filmmaker and public television producer. Tead died in Westport, Connecticut in November 1973.

== Career ==
Tead graduated from Boston Latin School in 1908 attended Amherst College where he obtained his AB 1912. After his graduation he served as fellow of the Amherst College at Southend House, a settlement house in Boston, from 1912 to 1914. In 1915 he co-founded Valentine, Tead & Gregg, an industrial consultants' firm in Boston, Massachusetts. In 1917 he accepted a consulting position in the Bureau of Industrial Research in New York City until circa 1919. Following the U.S.A.'s entry into the First World War, Tead and Dr. Henry C. Metcalf co-taught the War Industries Board Employment Management Course at Columbia University in 1917-1918 to train employment and industrial relations managers for companies engaged in war production. This course provided the foundation for their pioneering textbook on this topic.

Tead continued to teach as a lecturer in personnel administration at Columbia University from 1920 to 1950 and as an adjunct professor of industrial relations until 1956. From 1920 to 1929 he was a member of the department of industry at the New York School of Social Work. From 1938 to 1953 he was chair of the New York Board of Higher Education, where in 1941 he was involved in sacking any faculty staff who belonged to a Communist, Fascist or Nazi organization.

In the year 1936-37, Tead served as first president of the Society for Advancement of Management (SAM) which resulted from merger of the Taylor Society and the Society of Industrial Engineers in 1936, where he was succeeded by William H. Gesell and many other eminent leaders in management practice and education in the following years.

From 1920 until his retirement in 1961 he worked in the publishing industry at both McGraw Hill (1920-1925) and Harper & Row as an editor of business, social science and economics books and director of the organization.

== Contributions (partial) ==
Tead authored or co-authored over 20 books and numerous monographs, book chapters, and articles for professional publications. In 1920, Tead and Henry C. Metcalf wrote Personnel Administration: its principles and practices, the first college level textbook in this emerging field and he served as a thought leader and advocate in the discipline's formative years up through the early 1930's. In 1939, Tead published New Adventures in Democracy, where he noted the growing realization of the need for subordination of personal ambition to collective action, such as in labor unions, and this collaboration to the advance of individual, group and societal welfare in a democracy; linking his work in personnel administration and industrial relations to public policy. Tead's book, The Art of Administration (1951), has been called his "magnum opus" where he contributed important insights on management and social philosophy. Much ahead of his time, Tead was an early advocate of participative management and employee empowerment and argued for seeing employees as organizational stakeholders. He was also an early proponent of corporate social responsibility arguing for the alignment of corporate aims with those of society and managers as agents of social change.

== Publications ==
Books, a selection

- Tead, Ordway. Instincts in industry, a study of working-class psychology. 1918
- Tead, Ordway, and Henry Clayton Metcalf. Personnel administration: its principles and practice. No. 18. McGraw-Hill Book Company, inc., 1920.
- Tead, Ordway. The art of leadership. (1935).
- Tead, Ordway. New Adventures in Democracy: Practical Applications in the Democratic Idea
- Tead, Ordway. The art of administration. (1951).
- Tead, Ordway. Human nature and management. Arno Press, 1977.

Articles, a selection

- Tead, Ordway, "Trade Unions and Efficiency," American Journal of Sociology, Vol. 22, No.1. (July 1916), p. 30-37.
- Tead, Ordway. "The War's Effects on English Trade Unions," The Journal of Political Economy, Vol.26, No.2, (Feb. 1918), p. 125-135.
- Tead, Ordway. "The British Reconstruction Programs," Political Science Quarterly, Vol.33, No.1. (Mar. 1918), p. 56-76.*
- Tead, Ordway. "The Problem of Graduate Training in Personnel Administration," The Journal of Political Economy, Vol.29, No.5. (May 1921), p. 353-367
- Tead, Ordway. "Autobiographical essay" in Finkelstein, L. (ed.) Thirteen Americans: Their Spiritual Autobiographies, Institute for Religious and Social Science, 1953, pp. 15–30
