= Ralph C. Davis =

American industrial engineer and academic

Ralph Currier Davis (December 24, 1894 – November 21, 1986) was an American industrial and consulting engineer, Professor of Business Organization at Ohio State University, and organizational theorist. He is known for his work on top management, especially his 1951 extension of Henri Fayol's work.

In his 1951 book, entitled The Fundamentals of Top Management, Davis built on Fayol's "early work on the scientific approach to management and introduced the rational-planning perspective, which has had enormous influence on both the theory and practice of strategy ever since."

== Biography ==
=== Youth education and early career ===
Davis was born in 1894 in Mohawk, New York, son of Frank Colin Davis and Susie Helen (Greene) Davis. He graduated from high school in 1912, In 1916 he obtained his MSc of Engineering from Cornell University, and later in 1926 his MA from Ohio State University.

After high school graduation Davis had started his career, in 1913, in the industry as special machinist apprentice. From 1916 to 1918 he was Junior industrial engineer at the Winchester Repeating Arms Company, and in 1919 served as industrial engineer at The Gleason Works, now Gleason Corporation in Rochester.

=== Further career and honours ===
After another four year, from 1919 to 1923, as assistant labor commissioner at the Cleveland Chamber of Commerce, Davis started his academic career at the Ohio State University in 1923 as assistant professor. He last appointment in the industry was head of the management department of the General Motors Institute, where he served from 1927 to 1930.

In 1930 back at the Ohio State University he was appointed associate professor, and in 1936 became Professor of business organization. He served at the College of Commerce and Administration of the Ohio State University until his retirement. In those years he was also Visiting professor at the Arkansas University, Columbia University, Indiana University, New York University, and at Stanford University.

In 1948 Davis served as president of the Academy of Management. In 1958 Davis was awarded the Taylor Key by the Society for Advancement of Management. In 1964 he was awarded an honorary Doctor of Science from the Wayne State University. One of his notable students was Dillard E. Bird, president of the Society for Advancement of Management from 1949 to 1951.

== Selected publications ==
- Davis, Ralph Currier. The principles of factory organization and management. Harper & brothers, 1928.
- Davis, Ralph Currier. The principles of business organization and operation, Columbus, O. : H. L. Hedrick, 4e ed. 1937.
- Davis, Ralph Currier. Industrial organization and management. Harper & Brothers, 1940.
- Davis, Ralph Currier. Shop Management for the Shop Supervisor. Harper & brothers, 1941.
- Davis, Ralph Currier, and Michael James Jucius. Purchasing and Storing. Vol. 34. Alexander Hamilton Institute, 1947.
- Ralph C. Davis, The Fundamentals of Top Management. New York: Harper and Brothers, 1951.
