= International Management Institute (ILO) =

The International Management Institute was an organisation set up by the International Labor Office (ILO) as an independent institute funded by the Twentieth Century Fund.
