= Rockville, West Virginia =

Rockville
- Unincorporated community
- Location within the state of West Virginia Rockville (the United States)
- Coordinates: 39°37′17″N 79°42′17″W
- Country: United States
- State: West Virginia
- County: Preston
- Elevation: 1,339 ft (408 m)
- Time zone: UTC-5 (Eastern (EST))
  - Summer (DST): UTC-4 (EDT)
- FIPS code: 1555511

Rockville is an unincorporated community located in Preston County, West Virginia, United States.

It was so named for the rocky terrain.
