= Quebec Run =

Stream in Pennsylvania, USA

Quebec Run Tributary to Big Sandy Creek
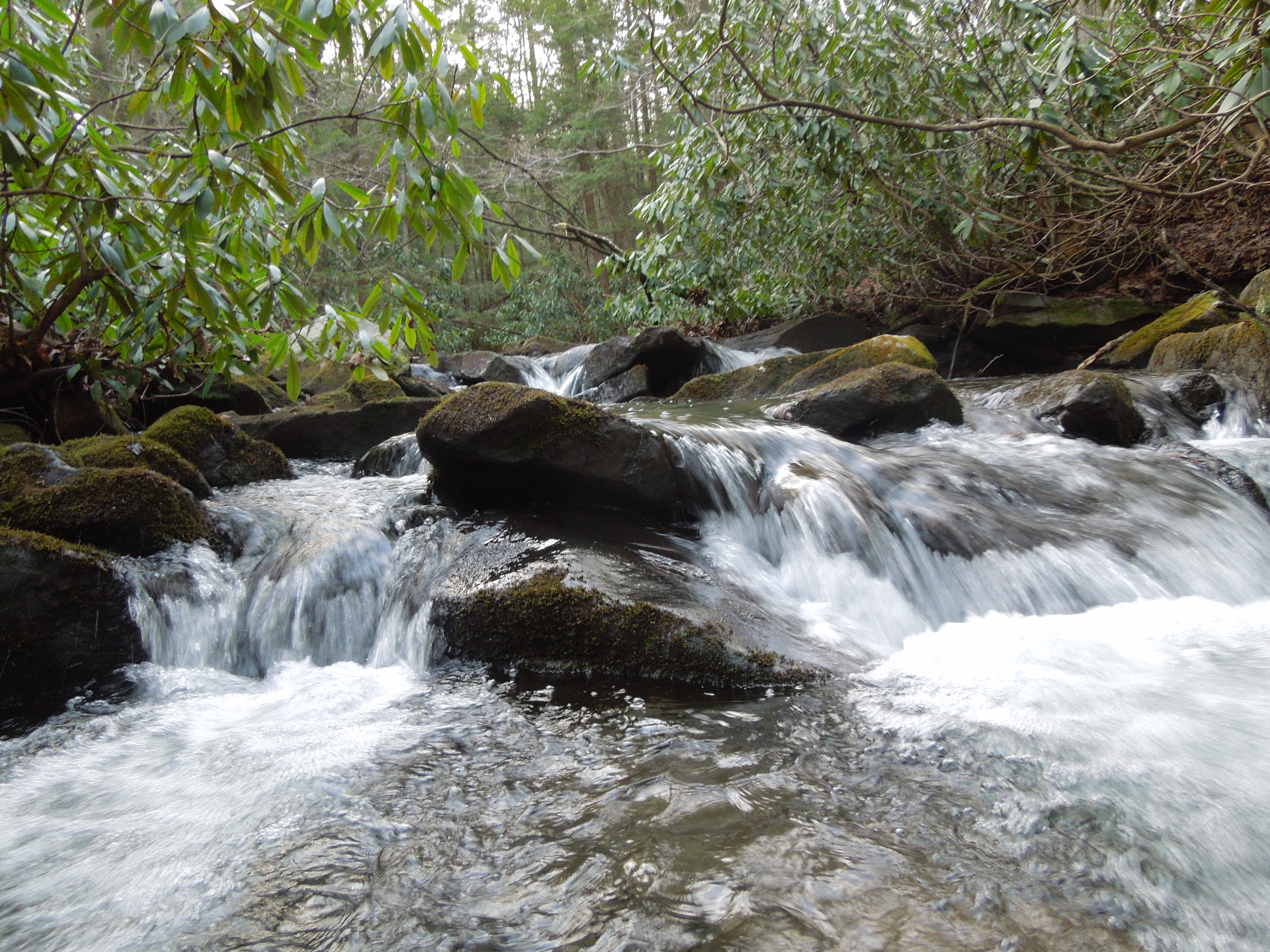
- Waterfall along Quebec Run

- Location of Quebec Run mouth Quebec Run (the United States)

Location
- Country: United States
- State: Pennsylvania
- County: Fayette

Physical characteristics
- Source: Brownfield Hollow divide
  - location: about 2 miles northeast of Wymps Gap, Pennsylvania
  - coordinates: 39°45′51″N 079°42′25″W
  - elevation: 2,240 ft (680 m)
- Mouth: Big Sandy Creek
  - location: about 4 miles southwest of Elliottsville, Pennsylvania
  - coordinates: 39°44′12″N 079°39′35″W
  - elevation: 1,550 ft (470 m)
- Length: 3.74 mi (6.02 km)
- Basin size: 14.33 square miles (37.1 km^{2})
- Discharge
  - location: Big Sandy Creek
  - average: 31.80 cu ft/s (0.900 m^{3}/s) at mouth with Big Sandy Creek

Basin features
- Progression: east and southeast
- River system: Monongahela River
- Tributaries
  - left: Mill Run
  - right: unnamed tributaries
- Bridges: none

Quebec Run is a 3.74 mi (6.02 km) long 3rd order tributary to Big Sandy Creek in Fayette County, Pennsylvania. This is the only stream of this name in the United States.

== Variant names ==
According to the Geographic Names Information System, it has also been known historically as:

- Mill Run

== Course ==
Quebec Run rises about 2 miles northeast of Wymps Gap, Pennsylvania, and then flows east and southeast to join Big Sandy Creek about 4 miles southwest of Elliottsville.

== Watershed ==
Quebec Run drains 14.33 square miles (37.1 km^{2}) of area, receives about 50.9 in/year of precipitation, has a wetness index of 320.85, and is about 94% forested.

== See also ==
- List of rivers of Pennsylvania
