= Armstrong Cork Company =

Historic building in Pittsburg, Pennsylvania, US

- U.S. National Register of Historic Places
- Pittsburgh Landmark – PHLF
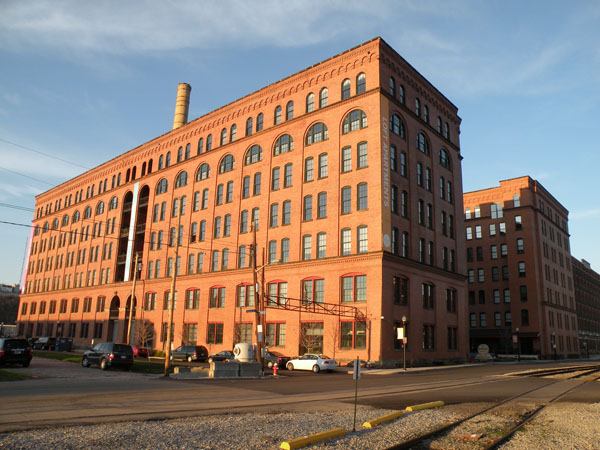

- Location within Pittsburgh Location within Pennsylvania Location within the United States
- Location: 23rd and Railroad Streets (Strip District), Pittsburgh, Pennsylvania, USA
- Coordinates: 40°27′16.08″N 79°58′59.8″W
- Built: circa 1901
- Architect: Frederick J. Osterling
- Architectural style: Romanesque Revival, Beaux-Arts
- NRHP reference No.: 05000413

Significant dates
- Added to NRHP: May 10, 2005
- Designated PHLF: 2007

The Armstrong Cork Company (formerly of Armstrong World Industries) was a cork manufacturer which was located at 2349 Railroad Street in the Strip District neighborhood of Pittsburgh, Pennsylvania.

Armstrong Cork Company eventually moved its headquarters to Lancaster, Pennsylvania. The company's product lines evolved from cork products and linoleum to vinyl floors, acoustical ceiling products, and glassware in each of which industries it was at one time a leading producer and brand.

== Building ==
The company's building was designed by architect Frederick J. Osterling and built circa 1901. It was added to the National Register of Historic Places on May 10, 2005, and to the List of Pittsburgh History and Landmarks Foundation Historic Landmarks in 2007.

Since 2007 the building has been maintained as loft apartments, known as "The Cork Factory " ("Cork Factory Lofts", and "The Cork Factory - Loft apartments on the river").
