= Harold Koontz =

American organizational theorist

Harold D. (Howdy) Koontz (May 19, 1909 – February 11, 1984) was an American organizational theorist, professor of business management at the University of California, Los Angeles and a consultant for many of America's largest business organizations. Koontz co-authored the book Principles of Management with Cyril J. O'Donnell; the book has sold around two million copies and has been translated into 15 languages.

== Biography ==
Koontz was born in 1909 in Findlay, Ohio, to Joseph Darius and Harriett (Dillinger) Koontz. He obtained his A.B. from Oberlin College, his MBA from Northwestern University in 1931, and his PhD from Yale University in 1935.

Koontz had started his academic career as instructor in business administration at Duke University in the year 1933–34. The next year, 1934–35, he was instructor in accounting and transparency at the University of Toledo. After his graduation in 1935 he was assistant professor in economics at Colgate University until 1942.

In World War II he served as a chief of traffic at the War Production Board in Washington from 1942 to 1944. Afterwards he moved into industry to become assistant to the president director of planning at Trans World Airlines from 1945 to 1948. After another two years as director commercial sales at Consolidated Vultee Aircraft Corporation, he returned to the academic world. In 1950 he was appointed professor of business management at the University of California, Los Angeles, where in 1962 he became Mead Johnson professor of management.

Koontz was awarded the Mead Johnson award in 1962; the USAF Air Force University award in 1971; the Taylor Key award in 1974; and the Fort Findlay award in 1975. Koontz died at age 75 on February 11, 1984, after suffering from arthritis.

Koontz's approach to management was "human relations". His best known advice is "manage-men-t", where "t" stands for tactfully.

Management Definition by H. Koontz " Management is an art of getting things done through and with the people in formally organized group."

== Selected publications ==
- Harold D. Koontz, Edgar S. Furniss. Government Control of Business. 1941; 2013.
- Harold Koontz and Cyril O'Donnell. Principles of management; An analysis of managerial functions. 1955; 1968; 1972; 1976.
- Harold Koontz and R. W Gable. Public Control of Private Enterprise, 1956.
- Harold Koontz. Readings in Management, 1959.
- Harold Koontz. Requirements for Basic and Professional Education for Management, 1964.
- Harold Koontz. Management; A Book of Readings, 4th edit., 1976.
- Koontz, Harold, Cyril O'donnell, and John Halff. Management: A systems and contingency analysis of managerial functions. 1976.
- Koontz, Harold, Cyril O'Donnell, and Heinz Weihrich. Essentials of management. McGraw-Hill, 1986; Tata McGraw-Hill Education, 2010.
- Weihrich, Heinz, and Harold Koontz. Management: A global perspective. Tata McGraw-Hill, 2005.

Articles, a selection

- Harold Koontz, "The Management Theory Jungle," Journal of the Academy of Management, 4 (December 1961), pp. 174–188.
- Harold Koontz, "The Management Theory Jungle Revisited," Academy of Management Review 5 (April 1980), pp. 175–187.
