= Clifton Mills, West Virginia =

Unincorporated community in West Virginia, United States

Clifton Mills
- Unincorporated community
- Location within the state of West Virginia Clifton Mills (the United States)
- Coordinates: 39°41′49″N 79°37′4″W
- Country: United States
- State: West Virginia
- County: Preston
- Elevation: 1,545 ft (471 m)
- Time zone: UTC-5 (Eastern (EST))
  - Summer (DST): UTC-4 (EDT)
- GNIS feature ID: 1537408

Clifton Mills is an unincorporated community in Preston County, West Virginia, United States. A post office was opened in Clifton Mills in 1881 and operated until being discontinued on November 22, 1963.

The community was named for cliffs near the original town site.
