= Henning Webb Prentis Jr. =

American industrialist

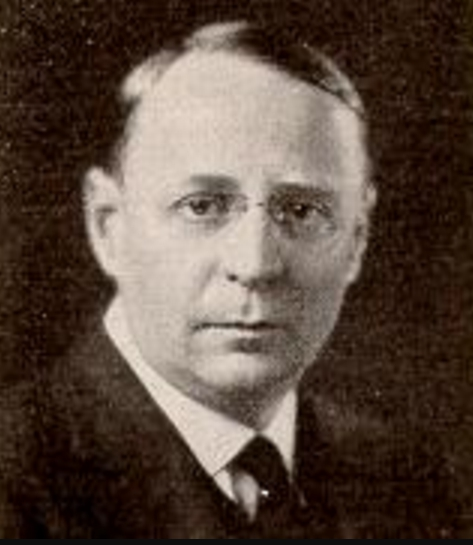
- Born: July 11, 1884; St. Louis, Missouri
- Died: October 29, 1959 (aged 75)
- Occupation: President
- Employer: Armstrong Cork Company,

Henning Webb Prentis Jr. (July 11, 1884 - October 29, 1959) was an American industrialist, known as president of the Armstrong Cork Company, president of the National Association of Manufacturers, and recipient of the Henry Laurence Gantt Medal in 1956. In the 1940s, he described the “Prentis Cycle”, according to which popular self-governance leads people from bondage to abundance and back to bondage.

== Life and work ==
Prentis was a son of Henning Webb Prentis Sr. and Mary Morton McNutt Prentis. He was born and raised in St. Louis, Missouri, attended Central High School in St. Louis graduating in 1901, and obtained his AB from the University of Missouri in 1903

After his graduation in 1903 he started his career in industry. In 1907 he joined the Armstrong Cork Company in Lancaster, Pennsylvania, where he worked his way up to First Vice President in 1933. In 1934 he became the next president of the Armstrong Cork Company. In his later years he was also president of the National Association of Manufacturers.

In 1956 the American Management Association and the ASME awarded him the annual Henry Laurence Gantt Medal for distinguished achievement in industrial management as a service to the community."

== The Prentis Cycle ==
In a 1943 address to the University of Pennsylvania entitled The Cult of Competency (later reprinted as Industrial Management in a Republic) Prentis described what has become known as The Prentis Cycle in which, he asserted, "popular self-government ultimately generates disintegrating forces from within", as:

From bondage to spiritual faith; from spiritual faith to courage; from courage to liberty; from liberty to abundance, from abundance to selfishness; from selfishness to apathy; from apathy to dependency; and from dependency back to bondage once more.

In a 1946 book, Prentis renamed one stage of the cycle and added two stages. The cycle, as revised, is:

From bondage to spiritual faith; from spiritual faith to courage; from courage to freedom; from freedom to abundance; from abundance to selfishness; from selfishness to complacency; from complacency to apathy; from apathy to fear; from fear to dependency; and from dependency back to bondage once more.

== Selected publications ==
- Prentis, Henning Webb. The Roots of American Liberty. University of Pennsylvania Press, 1941.
- Prentis, Henning Webb. Industrial Management in a Republic. No. 25. Printed at the Princeton University Press, 1943.

Selected articles

- Henning W. Prentis, Jr. "The Cult of Competency: Address Delivered at the Mid-Year Convocation." University of Pennsylvania, February 1943.
- Prentis Jr, H. W. "Taxation and Business Initiative." The Annals of the American Academy of Political and Social Science 266.1 (1949): 70-76.
- Prentis, H. W. "Liberal Education for Business and Industry." Bulletin of the American Association of University Professors (1915-1955) 38.3 (1952): 345-355.
- Prentis Jr, H. W. "The essential factors of good management." Mechanical Engineering 78.12 (1956): 1121-1124.

Books

- Prentis, Henning Webb (1946). Bulwarks of freedom. The Newcomen Society of England, American Branch.
