= 1925 United States gubernatorial elections =

- November 3, 1925

2 governorships
	Majority party	Minority party
Party	Democratic	Republican
Seats before	24	24
Seats after	24	24
Seat change	Steady	Steady
Seats up	2	0
Seats won	2	0
- Democratic hold

United States gubernatorial elections were held on November 3, 1925, in two states. Virginia holds its gubernatorial elections in odd numbered years, every 4 years, following the United States presidential election year. New Jersey at this time held gubernatorial elections every 3 years. It would abandon this practice in 1949.

== Race summary ==
=== Results ===
State	Incumbent	Party	First elected	Result	Candidates
New Jersey	George Sebastian Silzer	Democratic	1922	Incumbent term-limited. New governor elected. Democratic hold.	✓ A. Harry Moore (Democratic) 51.87%; Arthur Whitney (Republican) 47.64%; Leo M. Harkins (Socialist) 0.22%; Scattering 0.27%
Virginia	Elbert Lee Trinkle	Democratic	1921	Incumbent term-limited. New governor elected. Democratic hold.	✓ Harry F. Byrd (Democratic) 74.07%; Samuel Harris Hoge (Republican) 25.93%
