= Senator Parsons =

Senator Parsons may refer to:

- Andrew Parsons (American politician) (1817–1855), Michigan State Senate
- Cornelius R. Parsons (1842–1901), New York State Senate
- Henry Parsons (Massachusetts politician), Massachusetts State Senate
- John M. Parsons (1866–1946), Virginia State Senate
- Mosby Monroe Parsons (1822–1865), Missouri State Senate
- Robert E. Parsons (1892–1966), Connecticut State Senate
- Thomas Parsons (politician) (1814–1873), New York State Senate
- William Henry Parsons (colonel) (1826–1907), Texas State Senate

== See also ==
- Mike Parson (born 1955), Missouri State Senate
