= William Pine =

William Pine may refer to:

- William B. Pine (1877–1942), United States Senator from Oklahoma
- William H. Pine (1896–1955), American film producer
- William T. Pine (1873–?), American mayor of Marlborough, Massachusetts
- Terry Harknett (born 1936), British author who used William Pine as a pseudonym

== See also ==
- William Pyne (disambiguation)
