= Winfield Temple =

American lawyer and politician

22nd Mayor of Marlborough
- In office 1926–1929
- Preceded by: James M. Hurley
- Succeeded by: Amedee Martel

Personal details
- Born: November 4, 1875
- Died: 1957 (aged 81–82)
- Party: Republican
- Spouse: Lucy Howe Temple
- Profession: Lawyer

Winfield Temple (November 4, 1875 – 1957) was an American lawyer and politician who served as the 22nd Mayor of Marlborough, Massachusetts.

== Political career ==
In 1909, Temple ran for 9th Middlesex district in the Massachusetts House of Representatives as a Republican. He was defeated on November 2, 1909, by Democrat Charles F. McCarthy by 893 votes. McCarthy would later serve in the Massachusetts State Senate and was elected the 18th Mayor of Marlborough in 1917.

Temple served as the 22nd Mayor of Marlborough, Massachusetts from 1926 to 1929. He was the second mayor of Marlborough ever to be elected in a non-partisan election under a modified Massachusetts Plan B form of government.

== Notes ==
Political offices
Preceded by	Mayor of Marlborough, Massachusetts	Succeeded by
