= Glenwood Cemetery (Maynard, Massachusetts) =

Historic rural cemetery

- U.S. National Register of Historic Places
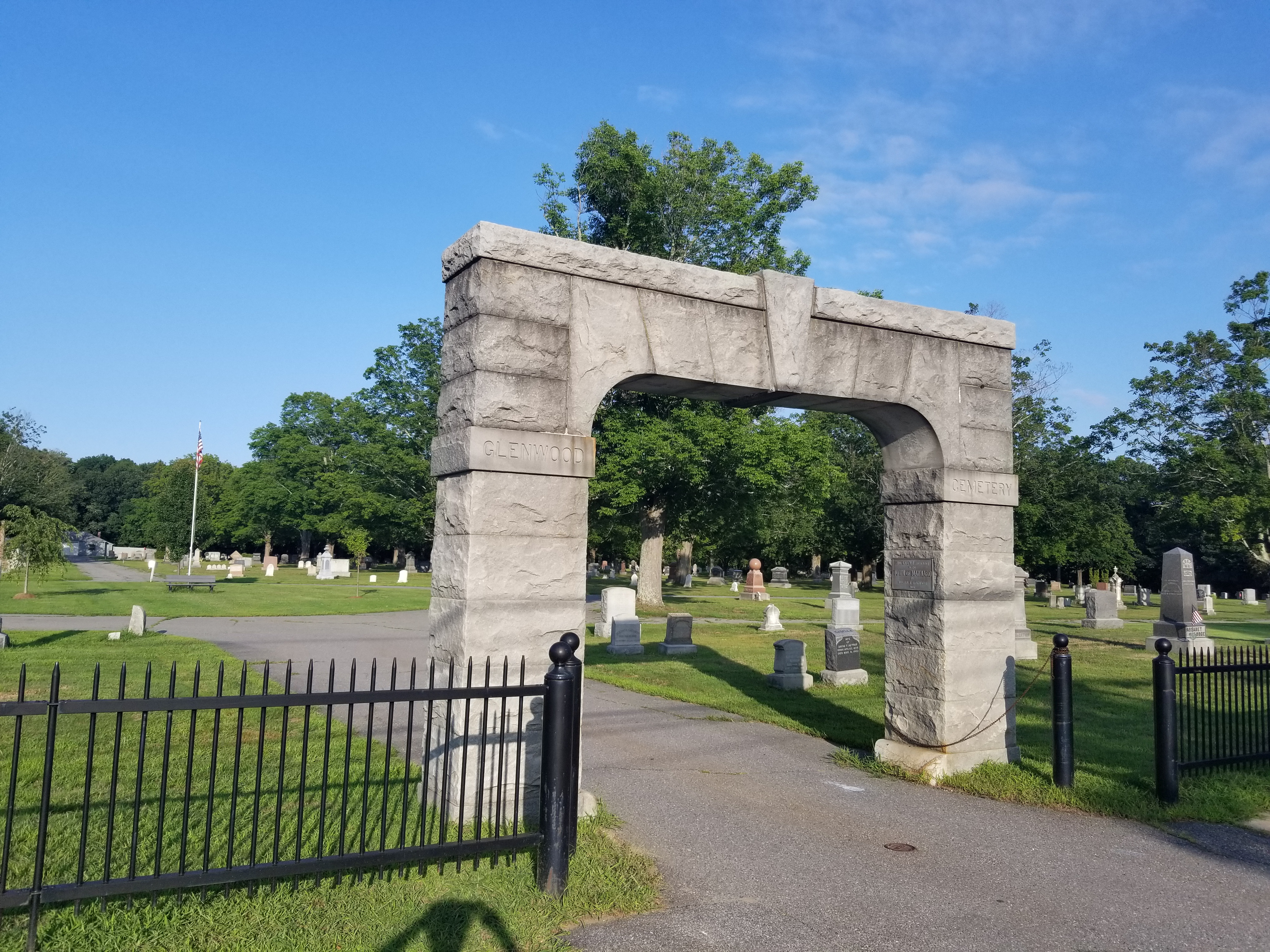

- Location within Massachusetts Location within the United States
- Location: Maynard, Massachusetts
- Coordinates: 42°25′26″N 71°26′39″W
- Area: 23 acres (9.3 ha)
- NRHP reference No.: 04000425
- Added to NRHP: May 12, 2004

Glenwood Cemetery is a historic rural cemetery northeast of Parker Street and Great Road in Maynard, Massachusetts. It is one of the first municipal creations of the town after its incorporation in 1871, and is the resting place of many of its early and prominent residents, including Amory Maynard, founder of the Assabet Woolen Mill and namesake of the community. The cemetery was added to the National Register of Historic Places (NR#04000425) on May 12, 2004.

== Description and history ==
Glenwood Cemetery is located at the northeast corner of Parker Street (Massachusetts Route 27) and Great Road (Massachusetts Route 117), a short way south of the town center. It has entrance is on Great Road, roughly midway between Parker Street and Old Mill Road, and on Parker Street, nearly opposite Walker Street. The cemetery has two distinct sections, reflecting its growth over time.

The oldest portion of the cemetery is 8 acres (3.2 ha) in size, and was purchased by the town in 1871, the year of its incorporation out of portions of Sudbury and Stow. This area was laid out in a version of the style of the then-fashionable rural cemetery movement, with a circular lane at the entrance and a series of parallel lanes behind. At the center of the circle there was originally a gazebo, which was to be a focal point of the cemetery. It was destroyed in the New England Hurricane of 1938. The main gate (image) is not the original. It replace an earlier cast iron gate in 1928. The majority of the trees in the cemetery are sugar maples, planted after the hurricane to replace downed trees. About two dozen burials pre-date the official creation of Glenwood Cemetery, suggesting that it was functioning as a privately owned cemetery before the land was purchased by the town. East of this original portion is the "new cemetery" section laid out in the 1930s, using labor funded by the Works Progress Administration. It has a series of concentric lanes in a roughly ovoid shape, and is joined to the old section by a single lane.

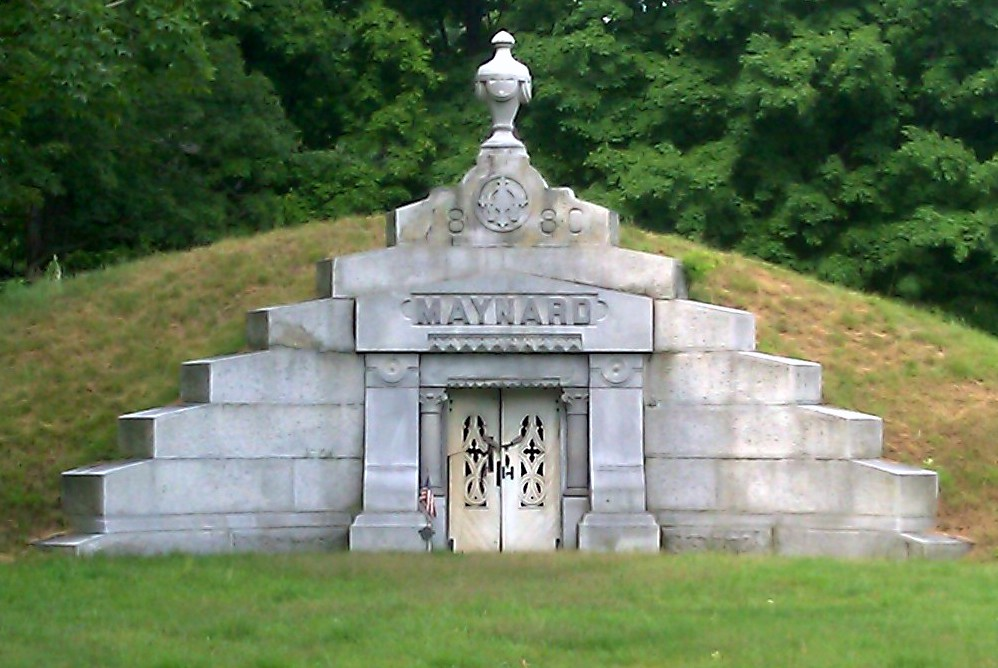
The Maynard family crypt in Glenwood Cemetery (Maynard, MA)

The Maynard family crypt is a prominent feature on the north side of Glenwood Cemetery, within sight of passers-by on Route 27. Amory Maynard (1804-1890) started a woolen mill on the Assabet River in 1846. In 1871 the village of mill workers and other residents officially became the Town of Maynard. The crypt is an imposing earth-covered mound with a granite facade facing the road. The mound is 90 feet across and about 12 feet tall. The stonework facade is approximately 30 feet across. The ceiling of the crypt has a glass skylight surmounted by an exterior cone of iron grillwork. The granite lintel above the door reads "MAYNARD." Chiseled above the lintel are the year 1880 and the Greek letters Alpha and Omega entwined with a Fleur-de-lis Cross. Amory Maynard, his wife, Mary, their third son, Harlan, and nineteen other descendants were interred in the crypt. Oldest son Lorenzo Maynard and his family were buried at Mount Auburn Cemetery, Cambridge, Massachusetts. Second son William was buried at Hope Cemetery, Worcester, Massachusetts, along with his wife and four of their seven children.

== See also ==
- National Register of Historic Places listings in Middlesex County, Massachusetts
