= Louis Farley =

Louis F. Farley

16th Mayor of Marlborough
- In office 1916–1916
- Preceded by: Thomas H. O'Halloran
- Succeeded by: William T. Pine

Member of the Marlborough, Massachusetts School Committee
- In office 1910–1910

Louis F. Farley was an American politician who served as the Mayor of Marlborough, Massachusetts and who served on the Marlborough, Massachusetts School Committee.

== Notes ==
Political offices
Preceded by Thomas H. O'Halloran	Mayor of Marlborough, Massachusetts; 1916	Succeeded by William T. Pine
