= Gadbois =

Gadbois is a surname. Notable people with the surname include:

- Dennis Gadbois (born 1963), American football player
- Denyse Gadbois (1921–2013), Canadian artist
- Edgar Gadbois (born c. 1936), American politician
- Geoffrey Gadbois (born 1994), American bobsledder
- Louise Landry Gadbois (1896–1985), Canadian painter
- Richard Arthur Gadbois Jr. (1932–1996), American judge
