= Edward Simoneau =

American mayor (1890–1965)

Edward Thomas Simoneau

20th Mayor of Marlborough
- In office 1922–1923
- Preceded by: Andrew Patrick Sullivan
- Succeeded by: James M. Hurley

Member of the Massachusetts Senate
- In office 1927–1930

Personal details
- Born: April 24, 1890
- Died: February 1965 (aged 74)
- Party: Republican
- Profession: Attorney

Edward Thomas Simoneau (April 24, 1890 - February 1965) was an American politician who served as the twentieth Mayor of Marlborough, Massachusetts.

== Political career ==
In 1922, Simoneau defeated Andrew Sullivan 2,836 votes to 2,153 votes to become the 20th mayor of Marlborough, Massachusetts. He was re-elected in 1923, defeating Charles F. McCarthy.

He later served in the Massachusetts Senate from 1927 to 1930.

== Judgeship ==
Simoneau was a Special Justice in the District Court of Marlborough, Massachusetts.

== See also ==
- 1927–1928 Massachusetts legislature

Political offices
Preceded by Andrew Patrick Sullivan	Mayor of Marlborough, Massachusetts; 1922–1923	Succeeded by James M. Hurley
