= List of mayors of Marlborough, Massachusetts =

Mayor of Marlborough
- Incumbent; J. Christian Dumais since January 1, 2024
- Seat: Marlborough City Hall
- Term length: 2 years (1924–present); 1 year (1891–1924)
- Formation: 1891
- First holder: S. Herbert Howe
- Website: Official website

This is a list of mayors of Marlborough, Massachusetts, USA. Marlborough became a city in 1890, previously it was a town, and as a town was administered by a Board of Selectmen.

#	Mayor	Picture	Term	Party	Notes
1st	S. Herbert Howe		January 5, 1891-January 1892	Republican	
2nd	George A. Howe		1892	Republican	
3rd	John O'Connell		1893	Republican	
4th	William N. Davenport		1894–1895	Republican	
5th	Charles L. Bartlett		1896–1897	Republican	
6th	Eugene G. Hoitt		1898	Democratic	
7th	Edward J. Plunkett		1899–1900	Democratic	At the time of his election, he was the city's youngest mayor.
8th	Walter B. Morse		1901–1903	Republican	
9th	Frederick R. S. Mildon		1904-January 2, 1905	Democratic	
10th	Henry Parsons		January 2, 1905 – 1906	Republican	
11th	Edward F. Brown		1907	Democratic	
12th	Henry Parsons		1908–1909	Republican	
13th	John J. Shaughnessy		1910	Democratic	
14th	J. Henry Gleason		1912 - 1913	Citizens' Party	
15th	Thomas H. O'Halloran		1914–1915	Democratic	
16th	Louis Farley		1916	Republican	
17th	William T. Pine		1917	Republican	
18th	Charles F. McCarthy		1918 - 1920	Democratic	
19th	Andrew Patrick Sullivan		1921	Democratic	
20th	Edward Simoneau		1922–1923	Republican	
21st	James M. Hurley		1924–1925	Democratic	First mayor elected to a two-year term. First non-partisan election under a modified Massachusetts Plan B form of government
22nd	Winfield Temple		1926–1929	Republican	
23rd	Amedee Martel		1930–1931		
24th	Charles Lyons		1932–1937		
25th	Louis Ingalls		1938-December 3, 1940		Committed suicide while in office on December 3, 1940.
26th	Michael Cronin		December 3, 1940 – 1946		Acting mayor after Louis Ingalls's death. Cronin was elected in his own right in the 1941 election.
27th	Carlton Allen		1946–1951		
28th	Romeo Gadbois		1952–1957	Republican	
29th	Frank Kelleher		1958–1959		
30th	Kuson Haddad		1960–1965	Democratic	
31st	Frank Walker		1966–1967		
32nd	Fred Cole		1968–1971		
33rd	Edgar Gadbois		1972–1975	Republican	
34th	Frank Kelleher		1976–1977		
35th	Joe Ferrecchia		1978–1983		
36th	Kuson Haddad		1984–1985	Democratic	
37th	Chester E. Conary		1986–1989		
38th	Michael P. Hogan		1990–1993	Democratic	
39th	J. Michael McGorty		1994–1997	Democratic	
40th	William J. Mauro		1998–2003		
41st	Dennis C. Hunt		2004–2005	Democratic	
42nd	Nancy E. Stevens		2006-January 2, 2012	Democratic	First woman to be elected Mayor of the City of Marlborough. Served three 2-year terms before choosing not to run for reelection for a fourth term.
43rd	Arthur G. Vigeant		January 2, 2012 – January 1, 2024	Republican	Longest serving Mayor of the City of Marlborough. Served six consecutive 2-year terms before choosing not to run for a seventh term.
44th	J. Christian Dumais		January 1, 2024-Incumbent	Independent	
