= 1958 United States Senate election in Virginia =

- November 4, 1958
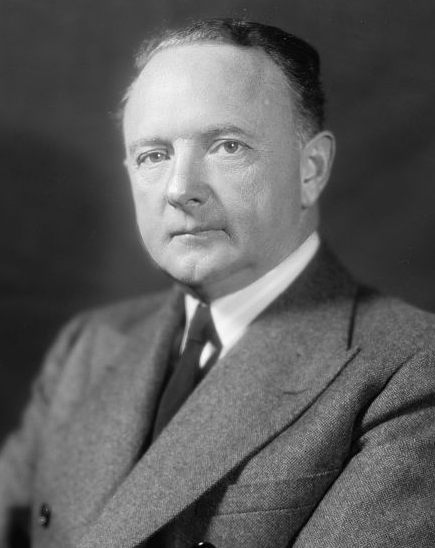

Nominee	Harry F. Byrd	Louise Wensel
Party	Democratic	Independent
Popular vote	317,221	120,224
Percentage	69.32%	26.27%
- County and independent city results Byrd: 40–50% 50–60% 60–70% 70–80% 80–90% 90–100% Wensel: 40–50% 60–70%
U.S. senator before election
Harry F. Byrd
Democratic
Elected U.S. senator
Harry F. Byrd
Democratic

The 1958 United States Senate election in Virginia was held on November 4, 1958. Incumbent Senator Harry F. Byrd, Sr. was re-elected to a sixth term after defeating Independent Louise Wensel and Social Democrat Clarke Robb.

== Results ==
United States Senate election in Virginia, 1958
Party	Candidate	Votes	%	±%
Democratic	Harry F. Byrd, Sr. (inc.)	317,221	69.32%	−4.03%
Independent	Louise Wensel	120,224	26.27%	
Social Democratic	Clarke T. Robb	20,154	4.40%	−7.98%
Write-ins		41	0.01%	−1.54%
Majority		196,997	43.05%	−17.58%
Turnout		457,640		
Democratic hold				

== See also ==
- 1958 United States Senate elections
