= Mayor of Marlborough =

Mayor of Marlborough may refer to:

- Mayor of Marlborough, Massachusetts
- Mayor of Marlborough, New Zealand
