= William Pyne =

William Pyne may refer to:

- William Henry Pyne, English writer and painter
- William Pyne (MP) for Melcombe Regis (UK Parliament constituency)

== See also ==
- William Pine (disambiguation)
