= Michael P. Hogan =

American businessman and politician

Chief Executive Officer of the Massachusetts Development Finance Agency
- In office 1993–2003
- Appointed by: Bill Weld
- Preceded by: Position established
- Succeeded by: Robert L. Culver

38th Mayor of Marlborough
- In office 1990–1993
- Preceded by: Chester E. Conary
- Succeeded by: J. Michael McGorty

Personal details
- Party: Democratic
- Profession: Politician; businessman; real estate developer

Michael P. Hogan is an American businessman and politician who served as the 38th mayor of Marlborough, Massachusetts. He also served as the first chief executive officer of Massachusetts Development Finance Agency.

== Career ==
=== Mayor of Marlborough ===
In 1989, Hogan was elected mayor of Marlborough, Massachusetts. He served two two-year terms and did not run for re-election in 1993.

=== CEO of MassDevelopment ===
In 1993, the Massachusetts Development Finance Agency (MassDevelopment) was created under Chapter 23G of the Massachusetts General Laws. This merged the Massachusetts Government Land Bank with the Massachusetts Industrial Finance Agency. That same year, Hogan was named MassDevelopment's first chief financial officer (CEO). In this role, Hogan served as a cabinet-level officer for Massachusetts Governor's Bill Weld, Paul Cellucci and Jane Swift.

As CEO, Hogan financed and managed the development of more than 7,000 acres of real estate across Massachusetts.

=== Private sector ===
In 2003, Hogan was named president and CEO of Wareham-based developer A.D. Makepeace Co. In 2013, Hogan was elected chairman of the Massachusetts Business Roundtable board of directors.
