= Edmund Parr =

Virginia politician (1849–1925)

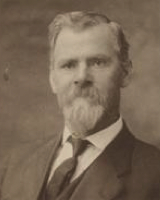

Member of the Virginia Senate from the 6th district
- In office January 10, 1912 – January 12, 1916
- Preceded by: John M. Parsons
- Succeeded by: M. Price Webb
- In office December 4, 1895 – December 6, 1899
- Preceded by: Lewis T. Jennings
- Succeeded by: Edwin J. Harvey

Member of the Virginia House of Delegates from Patrick County
- In office January 12, 1916 – January 9, 1918
- Preceded by: Booker Dalton
- Succeeded by: Richard S. Martin
- In office January 12, 1910 – January 10, 1912
- Preceded by: Daniel H. Wood
- Succeeded by: S. Tyler Rakes
- In office December 7, 1887 – December 4, 1889
- Preceded by: Samuel H. Hoge
- Succeeded by: Green W. DeHart
- In office December 7, 1881 – December 5, 1883
- Preceded by: William T. Akers
- Succeeded by: Abram F. Mays

Personal details
- Born: Edmund Parr; March 30, 1849 Patrick County, Virginia, U.S.
- Died: March 17, 1925 (aged 75) Patrick County, Virginia, U.S.
- Party: Republican
- Spouse(s): Agnes Stoops; Florida Thomas

Edmund Parr (March 30, 1849 – March 17, 1925) was an American Republican politician who served as a member of the Virginia House of Delegates and Senate, representing his native Patrick County.

Virginia House of Delegates
| Preceded by William T. Akers | Virginia Delegate for Patrick County; 1881–1883; 1887–1889; 1910–1912; 1916–1918 | Succeeded by Abram F. Mays |
| Preceded by Samuel H. Hoge | Virginia Delegate for Patrick County; 1881–1883; 1887–1889; 1910–1912; 1916–1918 | Succeeded by Green W. DeHart |
| Preceded by Daniel H. Wood | Virginia Delegate for Patrick County; 1881–1883; 1887–1889; 1910–1912; 1916–1918 | Succeeded by S. Tyler Rakes |
| Preceded by Booker Dalton | Virginia Delegate for Patrick County; 1881–1883; 1887–1889; 1910–1912; 1916–1918 | Succeeded by Richard S. Martin |
Senate of Virginia
| Preceded by Lewis T. Jennings | Virginia Senator for the 6th District; 1895–1899; 1912–1916 | Succeeded by Edwin J. Harvey |
| Preceded by John M. Parsons | Virginia Senator for the 6th District; 1895–1899; 1912–1916 | Succeeded by M. Price Webb |
