= Eugene G. Hoitt =

American physician

Eugene Gorham Hoitt
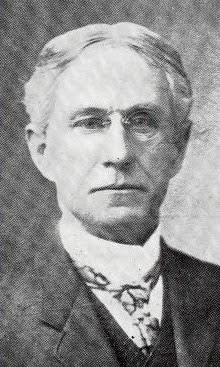

6th Mayor of Marlborough
- In office 1898–1898
- Preceded by: Charles L. Bartlett
- Succeeded by: Edward J. Plunkett

Personal details
- Born: April 12, 1850 Manchester, New Hampshire, U.S.
- Died: April 12, 1912 (aged 62) Seattle, Washington, U.S.
- Party: Democratic
- Spouse: Sarah Frances Barrett
- Education: Buffalo University, 1881
- Occupation: Surgeon

Eugene Gorham Hoitt (April 12, 1850 – April 12, 1928) was a Massachusetts surgeon and politician who served as the sixth mayor of Marlborough, Massachusetts.

== Biography ==
Hoitt was the oldest child of the railroad engineer Samuel Locke Hoitt and Ann Jane Hadley. In 1864, his father survived the Shohola train wreck as the engineer of the Confederate prisoner's train. In 1873 Hoitt married Sarah Frances Barrett, with whom he had two daughters.

Hoitt was the first Democrat ever to be elected mayor of Marlborough. As well as serving as the city's sixth mayor, Hoitt was a member of the Massachusetts State Medical League and served as Medical examiner for the ninth district. In 1900 and 1902, Hoitt served as the President of the Middlesex County Medical Society.

Political offices
Preceded by Charles L. Bartlett	3rd Mayor of Marlborough, Massachusetts; 1898-1898	Succeeded by Edward J. Plunkett
