= James Michael Hurley =

American politician

James M. Hurley
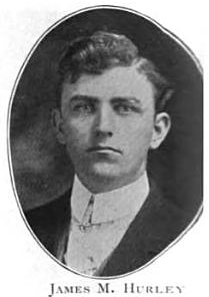

21st Mayor of Marlborough
- In office 1924–1925
- Preceded by: Edward Simoneau
- Succeeded by: Winfield Temple

Member of the Massachusetts House of Representatives
- In office January 3, 1912 – January 6, 1915

Personal details
- Party: Democratic

James M. Hurley was an American politician who served as the 21st mayor of Marlborough, Massachusetts. He was also a member of the Massachusetts General Court and mounted an unsuccessful race for the United States Congress in 1926.

== Political career ==
Hurley was the 21st Mayor of Marlborough, Massachusetts. He was the first mayor of Marlborough elected to a two-year term. He was also the first mayor elected in a non-partisan election under a modified Massachusetts Plan B form of government.

In 1926 Hurley was the Democratic nominee for U.S. Representative from the 5th Massachusetts' congressional district. He lost to incumbent Edith Nourse Rogers; the first woman elected to congress from New England and just the sixth woman ever elected to congress. Hurley only garnered 28.9% of the vote to Rogers' 71.1%.
