= S. Herbert Howe =

American mayor and politician in Massachusetts

Simon Herbert Howe
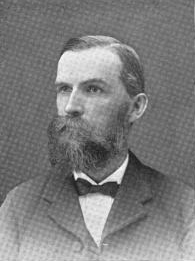

1st Mayor of Marlborough
- In office January 5, 1891 – January 1892
- Preceded by: Position established
- Succeeded by: George A. Howe

Member of the Massachusetts Governor's Council
- In office 1901–1904

Member of the Massachusetts House of Representatives
- In office January 2, 1878 – 1878
- Preceded by: James T. Murphy
- Succeeded by: Daniel S. Mooney

Member of the Marlborough Board of Selectmen
- In office 1866, 1873, 1875, 1877

Personal details
- Born: December 21, 1835 Marlborough, Massachusetts
- Died: May 11, 1911 (aged 75) Southborough, Massachusetts
- Party: Republican
- Spouse(s): Harriett A. Brigham (m. January 1, 1857) (1836–1914)
- Children: Louis P. Howe (1858–1945); Alice B. (1859–1860); Charlotte A. (born c. 1862); Annie (1871–1887)
- Occupation: Cooper, shoe manufacturer

Simon Herbert Howe (December 21, 1835 – May 11, 1911) was a Massachusetts businessman and politician who was the first mayor of Marlborough, Massachusetts, and a member of the Massachusetts House of Representatives. He also served as a member of Marlborough's Board of Selectmen, chairman of Marlborough's School Committee, and as a member of the Massachusetts Governor's Council.

== Early life and family ==
Howe was born in Marlborough, Massachusetts, to Samuel (1800–1864) and Charlotte Howe (1800–1839). Howe was a direct descendant of John Howe (1602-1680) who arrived in Massachusetts Bay Colony in 1630 from Brinklow, Warwickshire, England, and settled in Sudbury, Massachusetts. Howe was also a descendant of Edmund Rice another early immigrant to Massachusetts Bay Colony (Note: The descendancy of Howe from Edmund Rice is as follows: Edmund Rice (1594-1663); Edward Rice (1622-1712); Benjamin Rice (1666-1748); Rachel Rice (1703-1782); Asa Howe (1733- ?); Capt. Abraham Howe (1770-1848); Samuel Howe (1800-1864); Simon Herbert Howe (1835-1911).)

He first learned to make shoes while working for a manufacturer named John W. Stevens. In 1855, Howe graduated from Marlborough High School. Howe married Harriett A. Brigham on January 1, 1857. They had four children including a son, Louis P. Howe.

== Business career ==
Howe was president of the S.H. Howe Shoe Company and the president of the Marlborough Savings Bank. When Marlborough became a city in 1890, Howe had an image of his own factory incorporated into the city seal, where it remains to this day.

In 1855, Howe began to manufacture shoes in a shop in Marlborough with his brother, Lewis A. Howe. He subsequently purchased his brother's share of the business and moved locations within the City of Marlborough. On March 12, 1878, he purchased the "Diamond F" shop on Pleasant Street in Marlborough from James Tucker. On June 4, 1889, he purchased the "Diamond O" shop from C. L. & L. T. Frye and added it to his shoe manufacturing plant. As of 1892, the S. H. Howe Shoe Company consisted of three factories producing 10,000 pairs of shoes per day.

Howe was elected trustee of the Marlborough Savings Bank in 1875, and in 1882 was chosen president of the institution. In 1879, Howe was one of the original incorporators of People's National Bank, and was a member of the institutions Board of Directors.

== Political career ==
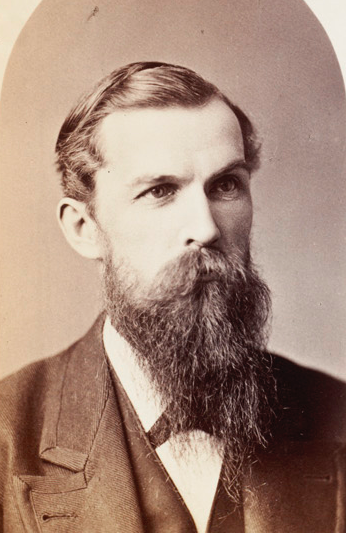
Howe's portrait as a member of the Massachusetts House of Representatives

Throughout his life, Howe was regularly called upon to represent Marlborough at both the local and state political level. He held office as a member of Marlborough's Board of Selectmen in 1866, 1873, 1875 and 1877. He also served as chairman of Marlborough's school committee for a number of years.

On November 6, 1877, Howe was elected to the Massachusetts House of Representatives. He took office on January 2, 1878 as a member of the 99th Massachusetts General Court. In his first and only legislation session as a member of the General Court, Howe served as the chairman of the Committee on Manufactures.

In 1890, Howe was elected the first mayor of Marlborough following the town's incorporation as a City. Upon his election, he was praised for having a "most admirable administration". Following just one year as mayor, Howe retired.

A decade later, Howe was elected to the Massachusetts Governor's Council in 1901, 1902, 1903 and 1904. He served on the Council during the administrations of Governors Roger Wolcott and Winthrop Murray Crane.

== Later life and death ==
Howe died in Southborough, Massachusetts on May 11, 1911.

== Notes ==
Notes

Citations

Political offices
Preceded by Board of Selectmen	1st Mayor of Marlborough, Massachusetts; January 5, 1891 – January 1892	Succeeded by George A. Howe
