= Statue of Harry F. Byrd =

Statue in Richmod, Virginia

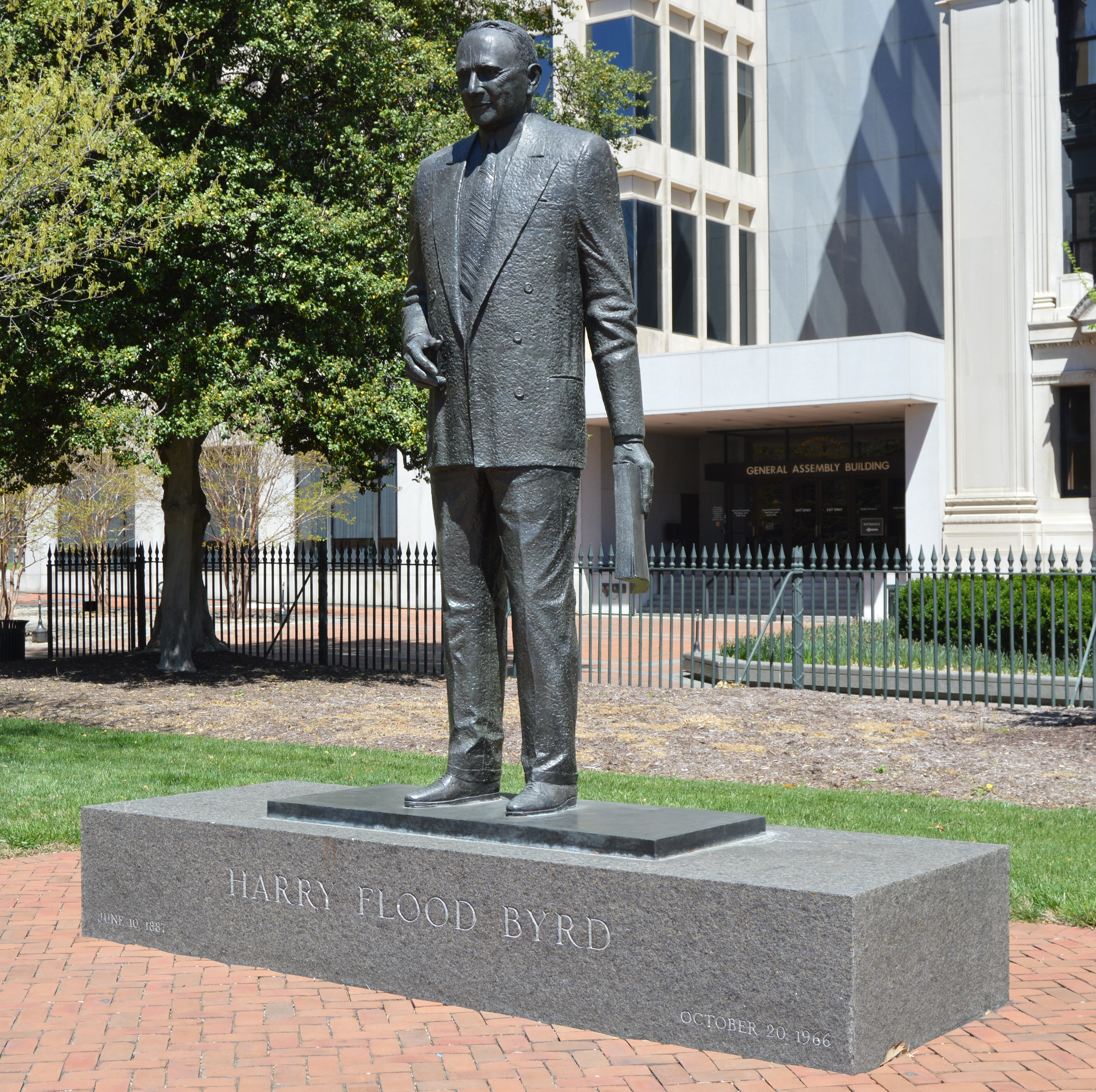
- The statue in 2017
- Subject: Harry F. Byrd
- Location: Richmond, Virginia, United States; 37°32′23″N 77°26′02″W

A statue of Harry F. Byrd, the 50th governor of Virginia, was installed in Capitol Square, Richmond, Virginia, in 1976. The statue was removed in 2021.
