= M. Price Webb =

American politician (1862–1938)

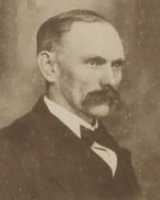

Member of the Virginia Senate from the 6th district
- In office January 12, 1916 – January 14, 1920
- Preceded by: Edmund Parr
- Succeeded by: John M. Parsons

Member of the Virginia House of Delegates from Carroll County
- In office January 10, 1912 – January 14, 1914
- Preceded by: J. G. Ayers, Jr.
- Succeeded by: J. R. Branscomb

Personal details
- Born: Marshall Price Webb; February 9, 1862 Hillsville, Virginia, U.S.
- Died: May 16, 1938 (aged 76) Carroll, Virginia, U.S.
- Party: Republican
- Spouse(s): Emeline Susan Edwards; Orlena Emily Marshall

Marshall Price Webb (February 9, 1862 – May 16, 1938) was an American Republican politician who represented the Virginia's 6th district in the state senate.

Virginia House of Delegates
Preceded by J. G. Ayers, Jr.	Virginia Delegate for Carroll County; 1912–1914	Succeeded by J. R. Branscomb
Senate of Virginia
Preceded by Edmund Parr	Virginia Senator for the 6th District; 1916–1920	Succeeded by John M. Parsons
