= Louis Ingalls =

American politician

25th Mayor of Marlborough
- In office 1938–1940
- Preceded by: Charles Lyons
- Succeeded by: Michael Cronin

Member of the Marlborough School Committee
- In office 1922–1938

Personal details
- Born: 1885 Marlborough, Massachusetts
- Died: December 3, 1940 (aged 54–55) Marlborough, Massachusetts
- Resting place: Maplewood Cemetery; Marlborough, Massachusetts

Louis F. Ingalls (1885 – December 3, 1940) was an American politician who served as mayor of Marlborough, Massachusetts from 1938 to 1940.

== Early life ==
Ingalls was born in Marlborough in 1885. He graduated from Marlborough High School in 1902 and went on to work for the Rice & Hudson Shoe Company and the Frye-Corbin Box Manufacturing Company. He married Marion Searles, also of Marlborough, and they had one daughter.

== Political career ==
Ingalls served on the Marlborough school committee from 1922 to 1938. In 1937 he challenged incumbent Mayor Charles Lyons. He easily defeated Lyons, who conceded after the votes of three of the city's seven wards were tabulated.

During his first term as mayor, Ingalls dealt with a controversy surrounding copies of Apollo Belvedere and Venus de Milo that the school committee voted to remove from the high school auditorium because of their lack of clothing. The committee eventually decided to move the statues to a small room used for drawing.

He also led the city during the 1938 New England hurricane. Due to power outages, Ingalls ordered that all stores close at dark. However, he requested that restaurants remain open to feed the members of the Massachusetts National Guard who were on patrol in the city. The city employed 1,000 men to clear debris and spent $10,000 to repair public buildings.

In 1939, Ingalls defeated Lyons in a rematch to win a second term.

On November 8, 1940, Ingalls and city solicitor John J. Ginnetti were indicted on bribery charges for allegedly selling two jobs in the Marlborough Fire Department. Their trial was scheduled to begin on December 5. However, on December 3, Ingalls left a suicide note for his wife stating "I will sleep at Fort Meadow tonight near the old causeway". He then drove to Fort Meadow Reservoir, walked out onto the ice, cut a hole with an ax, and plunged into the water. His body was found several hours later by the fire department. A private funeral was held at the Ingalls home on December 6. City Hall was draped in mourning, schools were closed, and factories did not run that day. He was buried in Maplewood Cemetery. On December 10, Ginnetti pled guilty and resigned from the bar. He was sentenced to six months in jail.
