= Massachusetts Development Finance Agency =

The Massachusetts Development Finance Agency (MassDevelopment) was created in 1998 under Chapter 23G of the Massachusetts General Laws, which merged the Massachusetts Government Land Bank with the Massachusetts Industrial Finance Agency. Both a lender and developer, MassDevelopment works with businesses, nonprofits, financial institutions, and communities to stimulate economic growth across the Commonwealth. Through these collaborations the agency helps create jobs, increase the number of housing units, revitalize urban environments, and address factors limiting economic growth including transportation, energy, and infrastructure deficiencies. MassDevelopment's first president and CEO was Michael P. Hogan, from 1993 to 2003, followed by Robert L. Culver from 2004 to 2011, Marty Jones from 2011 to 2017, and Lauren A. Liss, from 2017 through 2020. Since January 2021 the agency has been led by Dan Rivera, who is under appointment until 2026. MassDevelopment is headquartered in Boston, with regional offices in Devens, Fall River, Lawrence, Springfield, and Worcester.

== History ==
MassDevelopment formed in 1998 from a merger of the Government Land Bank and Massachusetts Industrial Finance Agency. The Massachusetts Health and Educational Facilities Authority was merged into MassDevelopment in 2010, strengthening the depth of offerings for tax-exempt bond financing of capital projects.

== Recent projects and investments ==
During fiscal year 2018, MassDevelopment financed or managed 384 projects generating investment of more than $4.1 billion in the Massachusetts economy. These projects are estimated to create or support about 10,994 jobs and build or rehabilitate 830 housing units. Projects vary in nature and size from real estate and equipment financings to the ongoing redevelopments of Devens, Village Hill Northampton, Springfield's 1550 Main, and the expansion of the Myles Standish Industrial Park in Taunton.

Recent financing projects include tax-exempt bonds on behalf of affordable housing projects in Boston's Dorchester and Roxbury neighborhoods, Somerville, and Springfield; the construction of a new 1,210-bed residence hall at University of Massachusetts Dartmouth; the expansion of Valley Steel Stamp's manufacturing headquarters in Greenfield; and a loan to Atomic Coffee Roasters to help the small business buy equipment for its new coffee-roasting and cold brew production facility in Danvers.

== Programs and initiatives ==
In addition to its finance and real estate services, MassDevelopment administers several economic development programs on behalf of the Commonwealth, including the Advanced Manufacturing Futures Program; the Brownfields Redevelopment Fund; the Collaborative Workspace Program; Commonwealth Places, in partnership with Patronicity; the Emerging Technology Fund; and the Site Readiness Program. Additionally, together with the Massachusetts Cultural Council, MassDevelopment jointly administers the state's Cultural Facilities Fund.

MassDevelopment is also a member of the Massachusetts Military Asset and Security Strategy Task Force, which was created in 2012 to protect and expand missions, jobs, and economic investments at and surrounding Massachusetts’ military installations.

In 2014, MassDevelopment launched the Transformative Development Initiative (TDI), a place-based development program for Gateway Cities designed to enhance local public-private engagement and community identity; stimulate an improved quality of life for local residents; and spur increased investment and economic activity. To date, MassDevelopment has established 14 TDI Districts in 13 Gateway Cities: Brockton, Chelsea, Fitchburg, Haverhill, Holyoke, Lawrence, Lynn, New Bedford, Peabody, Pittsfield, Revere, Springfield, and Worcester.
