= John O'Connell (mayor) =

American politician

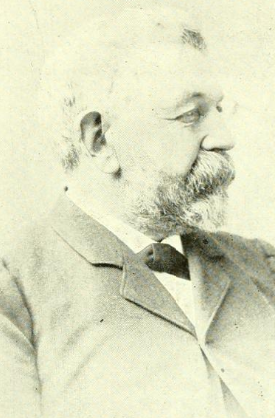

3rd Mayor of Marlborough
- In office 1893–1893
- Preceded by: George A. Howe
- Succeeded by: William N. Davenport

Member of the Board of Selectmen of the Town of Marlborough

Personal details
- Born: June 24, 1826 Middleton, Ireland
- Died: August 20, 1909 (aged 83)
- Party: Republican
- Profession: Shoe manufacturer

John O'Connell (June 24, 1826 – August 20, 1909) was an American shoe manufacture, and political figure who was a member of the Board of Selectmen and the third Mayor of Marlborough, Massachusetts.

== Early life ==
O'Connell was born on June 24, 1826, in Middleton, Ireland.

== Political career ==
In 1893, O'Connell succeeded George A. Howe as the third Mayor of Marlborough, Massachusetts.

== Death ==
O'Connell died on August 20, 1909.

== Notes ==
Political offices
Preceded by George A. Howe	3rd Mayor of Marlborough, Massachusetts; 1893	Succeeded by William N. Davenport
