= George A. Howe =

American politician (c. 1849 – 1909)

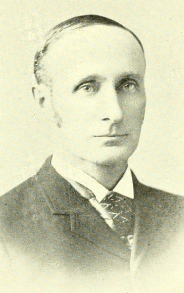

2nd Mayor of Marlborough
- In office 1892–1892
- Preceded by: S. Herbert Howe
- Succeeded by: John O'Connell

Member of the Marlborough Board of Aldermen Ward 5
- In office 1892–1892

Member of the Marlborough Board of Selectmen

Personal details
- Born: 1848 or 1849 Marlborough, Massachusetts, US
- Died: November 8, 1909 (aged 60) Marlborough, Massachusetts, US
- Party: Republican

George A. Howe (1848 or 1849 – 1909) was an American politician who served as the second mayor of Marlborough, Massachusetts.

== Career ==
Howe served as a member of the Marlborough Board of Alderman in 1892. He also served as a member of the Marlborough Board of Selectmen.

In 1892, he succeeded Simon Herbert Howe as the second mayor of Marlborough.

== Death ==
Howe died at his home in Marlborough on November 7, 1909, at age 60.

== Notes ==
Political offices
Preceded by S. Herbert Howe	2nd Mayor of Marlborough, Massachusetts; 1892-1892	Succeeded by John O'Connell
