= Amory Maynard =

American textile manufacturer (1804–1890)

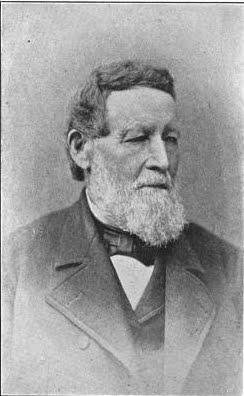
- Born: February 28, 1804; Marlborough, Massachusetts, US
- Died: March 5, 1890 (aged 86); Maynard, Massachusetts
- Burial place: Glenwood Cemetery (Maynard, Massachusetts)
- Occupation: Textile manufacturer
- Known for: Founded Assabet Woolen Mill

Amory Maynard (February 28, 1804 – March 5, 1890) was an American textile manufacturer and the namesake of Maynard, Massachusetts. He co-founded the Assabet Woolen Mill in 1846 and managed the business until his death.

== Early life ==
Amory Maynard was born in Marlborough, Massachusetts, in 1804 to Isaac and Lydia Howe Maynard. The Maynards were descendants of a Puritan, John Maynard, who came to Massachusetts from England in 1635. At age fourteen, Amory Maynard left school to work in his family's farm and saw mill at Fort Meadow Pond. At age sixteen, Maynard took over management of the family saw mill when his father died. Maynard also started a large construction business. In 1826 Maynard married Mary P. Priest. They had three sons: Lorenzo (1829–1904), William (1833–1906) and Harlan (1843–1861).

== Creation of Assabet Woolen Mill and Town of Maynard ==
Maynard's first mill was forced to close when the City of Boston acquired Fort Meadow Pond for the City's water supply. With the money he received from the buy-out, Maynard partnered with William Knight (who retired in 1852) to purchase land and water rights for the Assabet River in Sudbury and Stow. They founded the Assabet Woolen Mill in 1846, producing carpets and later wool used in military uniforms during the American Civil War. Expansion of the mill combined with hiring of people to work in it led to a population increase in what was known as Assabet Village. In 1871 the people of the area petitioned the Commonwealth of Massachusetts for the right to become a town. The Town of Maynard—named after Amory—came into being on April 19, 1871.

== Later life ==
Amory was actively involved in running the mill business until 1885 (age 81), when he suffered a stroke. Lorenzo, his oldest son, took over managing the mill. William participated but later moved away, and Harlan had died young. In addition to the mill, Amory was central to making sure the railroad came to Maynard and to the construction of the first church, on land he and Knight donated. He and Lorenzo operated a construction company that built many of the boarding houses and homes in town. Amory died in 1890 and was buried in a mausoleum at the Glenwood Cemetery. His son Lorenzo continued in management of the mill for several years, but left after it became bankrupt in 1898. The mill reopened the next year as part of the American Woolen Company.

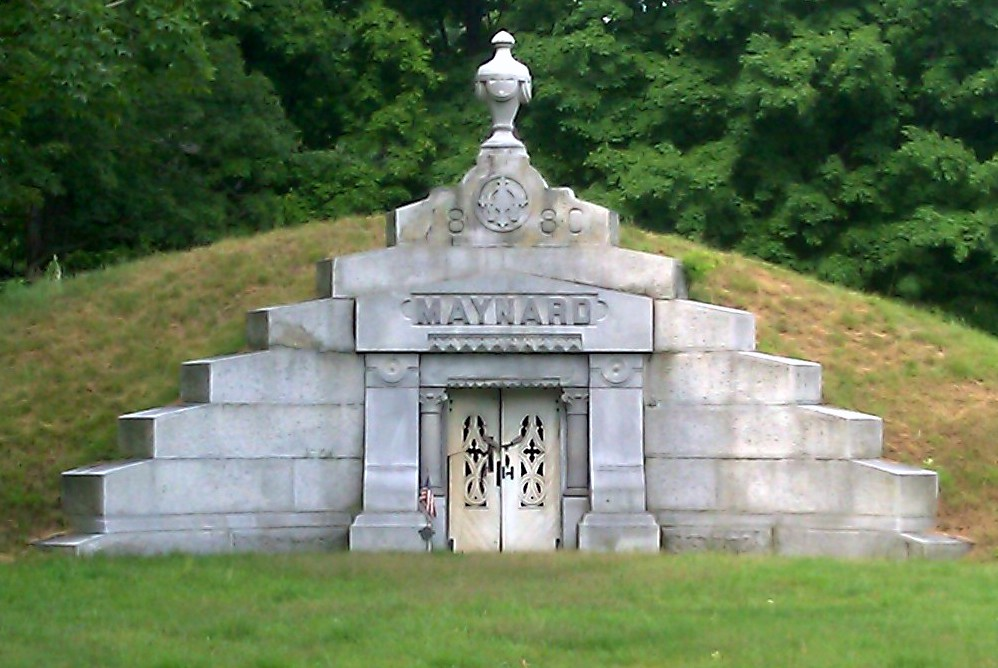
The Maynard Crypt in Glenwood Cemetery in Maynard, Massachusetts

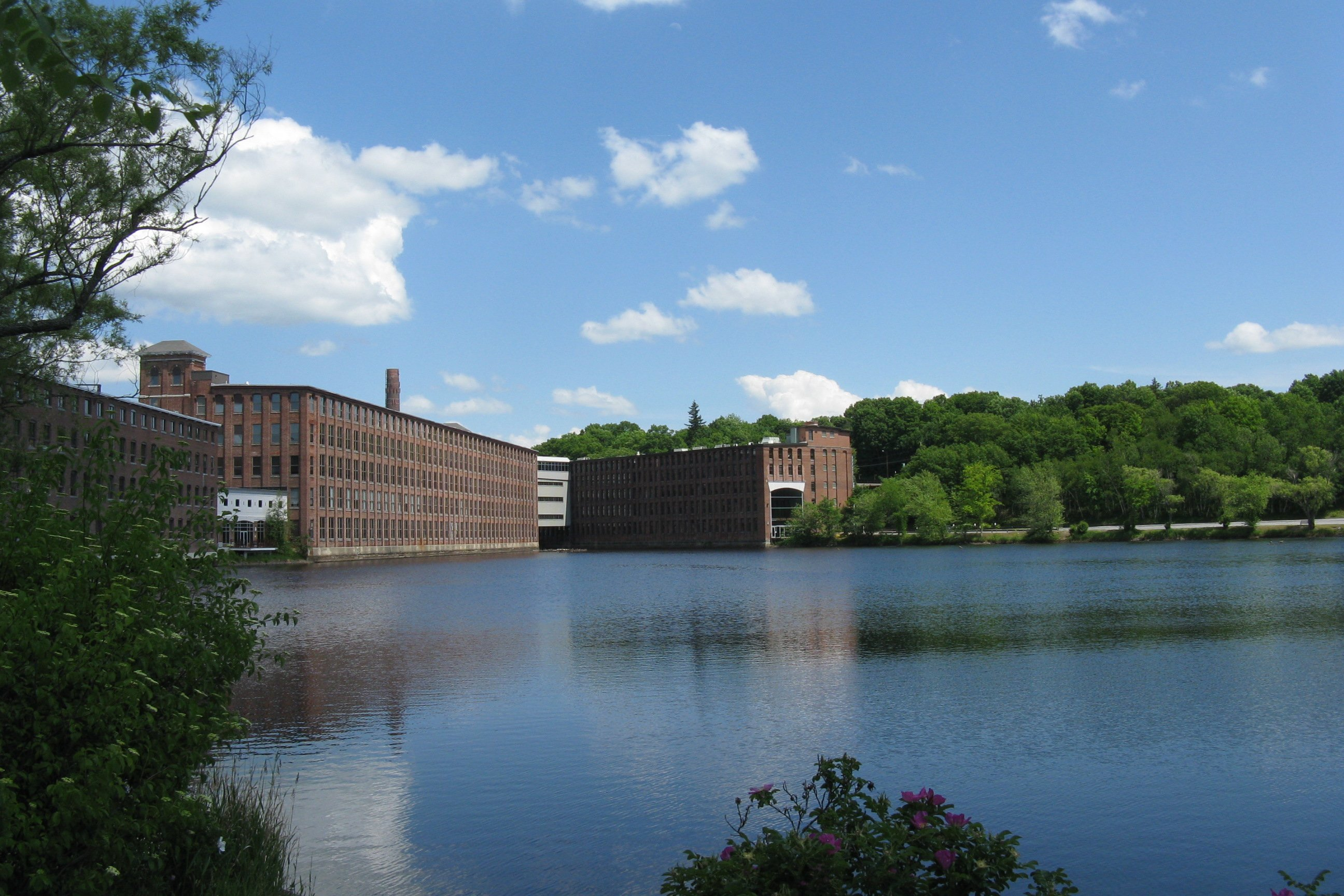
Assabet Woolen Mill (now called Mill & Main) on mill pond in Maynard, Massachusetts

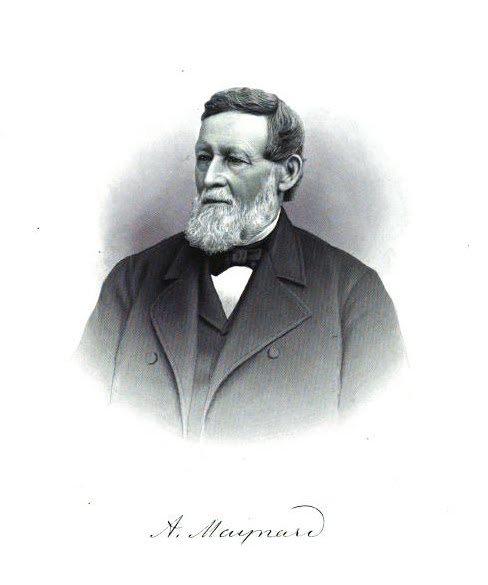
Amory Maynard lithograph
