= Louise Wensel =

American politician (1918–2005)

- Born: Mary Louise Oftedal; December 24, 1918; Fargo, North Dakota, U.S.
- Died: February 13, 2005 (aged 86); Charlottesville, Virginia, U.S.
- Education: Wellesley College (B.S.); George Washington University (M.D.)
- Political party: Independent
- Spouse: Alfred Fernbach

Louise Wensel (December 24, 1918 – February 13, 2005), was a Doctor of Medicine and political candidate and activist.

Wensel ran as an independent Senate candidate against incumbent Harry F. Byrd in the U.S. state of Virginia in 1958. Byrd was widely regarded as playing not only the role of United States Senator, but also as the powerful political boss of the Byrd Organization. He was notorious for his role in the "massive resistance" to racial desegregation by closing public schools rather than submit to court-ordered integration. Wensel's candidacy was based on her opposition to the closing of public schools and to all forms of discrimination. Despite death threats, violent attacks on campaign supporters and cross burnings, Dr. Wensel received widespread support and more than 23 percent of the official vote count in an election governed by the Jim Crow policies that characterized Virginia elections prior to the Voting Rights Act.

Despite her loss, Wensel's campaign energized Virginia moderates who continued working on the still-unresolved public school crisis. Fifteen "open-schools" committees joined together in the winter of 1958, with backing from the state teachers' association and the PTA to form the statewide Virginia Committee for Public Schools, which ultimately attracted 25,000 residents to its membership. In January 1959, the courts finally put an end to the assault of the Byrd Machine on public education, ruling that school closures to avoid desegregation were a violation of equal protection and were, therefore, unconstitutional.

After the 1958 elections, Wensel continued as a practicing physician until a few years prior to her death in Charlottesville, Virginia in 2005. For much of her career, she specialized in psychiatry, and in the 1970s, she played a major role in introducing acupuncture as a mainstream treatment approach in U.S. medicine. She was one of main doctors to participate in the famous Washington Acupuncture Center. She had offices in Washington, D.C., Baltimore, Maryland, and Florida, and wrote the textbook Acupuncture in Medical Practice (Reston Pub. Co., 1980). She was active throughout her life in movements for world peace and women's rights.

== Sources ==
- George Lewis, "'Any Old Joe Named Zilch?': The Senatorial Campaign of Dr. Louise Oftedal Wensel," Virginia Magazine of History and Biography 107, no.3 (Summer 1999): 287–316.
- The papers of Dr. Wensel and some notes on their content are accessible through the University of Virginia Special Collections
- Nancy MacLean, Democracy in Chains: The Deep History of the Radical Right's Stealth Plan for America, Viking, 2017, p. 65.
