= William N. Davenport =

American politician

William Nathanial Davenport
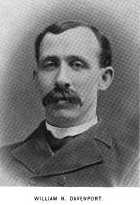

4th Mayor of Marlborough
- In office 1887–1887
- Preceded by: John O'Connell
- Succeeded by: Charles L. Bartlett

Member of the Massachusetts Senate
- In office 1888–1889

Member of the Massachusetts House of Representatives
- In office 1886–1887

Personal details
- Born: November 3, 1856 Boylston, Massachusetts
- Died: January 28, 1933 (aged 76) Miami, Florida, US
- Resting place: Boylston, Massachusetts
- Party: Republican
- Spouse: Lizzie M. Kendall
- Education: University of Michigan School of Law
- Occupation: Lawyer

William Nathanial Davenport (November 3, 1856 – January 28, 1933) was a Massachusetts, USA, politician who sat in both branches of the Massachusetts legislature, and was the fourth mayor of Marlborough, Massachusetts.

== Biography ==
Davenport was born in Boylston, Massachusetts, on November 3, 1856, as the son of Almira J. Howard and William J. Davenport. He attended law school at the University of Michigan in Ann Arbor, Michigan. In 1887, he married Elizabeth Moore "Lizzie" Kendall (1862–1957). They lived in Marlborough and Worcester, Massachusetts.

== Professional career ==
Davenport was admitted to the Michigan Bar in 1882 and the Massachusetts Bar in 1883. From 1886 to 1887, he was a member of the Massachusetts House of Representatives. In 1887, he succeeded John O'Connell as the fourth mayor of Massachusetts. Following his tenure as mayor, he was elected to the Massachusetts Senate as a member of the 110th Massachusetts General Court.

Political offices
Preceded by John O'Connell	4th Mayor of Marlborough, Massachusetts; 1887	Succeeded by Charles L. Bartlett
