= Edgar Gadbois =

American politician

Edgar C. Gadbois

33rd Mayor of Marlborough
- In office 1972–1975
- Preceded by: Fred Cole
- Succeeded by: Frank Kelleher

Member of the Marlborough City Council at-large
- In office 1968–1972
- In office 1962–1966

Personal details
- Born: c.1936
- Political party: Republican

Edgar C. Gadbois (born c.1936) is an American politician who served as the 33rd mayor of Marlborough, Massachusetts.

== Political career ==
Gadbois was first elected to the Marlborough City Council in 1961. Gadbois ran for the Massachusetts State Senate in 1964. He faced William I. Randall in the Middlesex and Worcester Senate district Republican primary. Randall defeated Gadbois by 3,493 votes.

In 1965, after incumbent mayor Kuson Haddad decided not to run for reelection, Gadbois announced his campaign for mayor of Marlborough. The 1965 election was one of the most contested elections in Marlborough's history, with over 80% of voters participating. Gadbois lost the election to businessman Frank Walker.

In 1967, he was again elected to the city council, serving until he was ultimately elected the 33rd mayor of Marlborough in 1971. He served as mayor from 1972 to 1975. Following his tenure as mayor, Gadbois served as the town administrator of Wareham, Massachusetts from 1975 to 1978 and municipal manager of Northfield, Vermont.

== Personal life ==
Gadbois' father, Romeo Gadbois, served as the 28th mayor of Marlborough. His brother, David P. Gadbois, was Marlborough's city solicitor.

Political offices
Preceded by Fred Cole	33rd Mayor of Marlborough, Massachusetts; 1972–1975	Succeeded by Frank Kelleher
