= Assabet Woolen Mill =

Historic building complex in Maynard, Massachusetts

Coordinates: 42.4310°N 71.4549°W

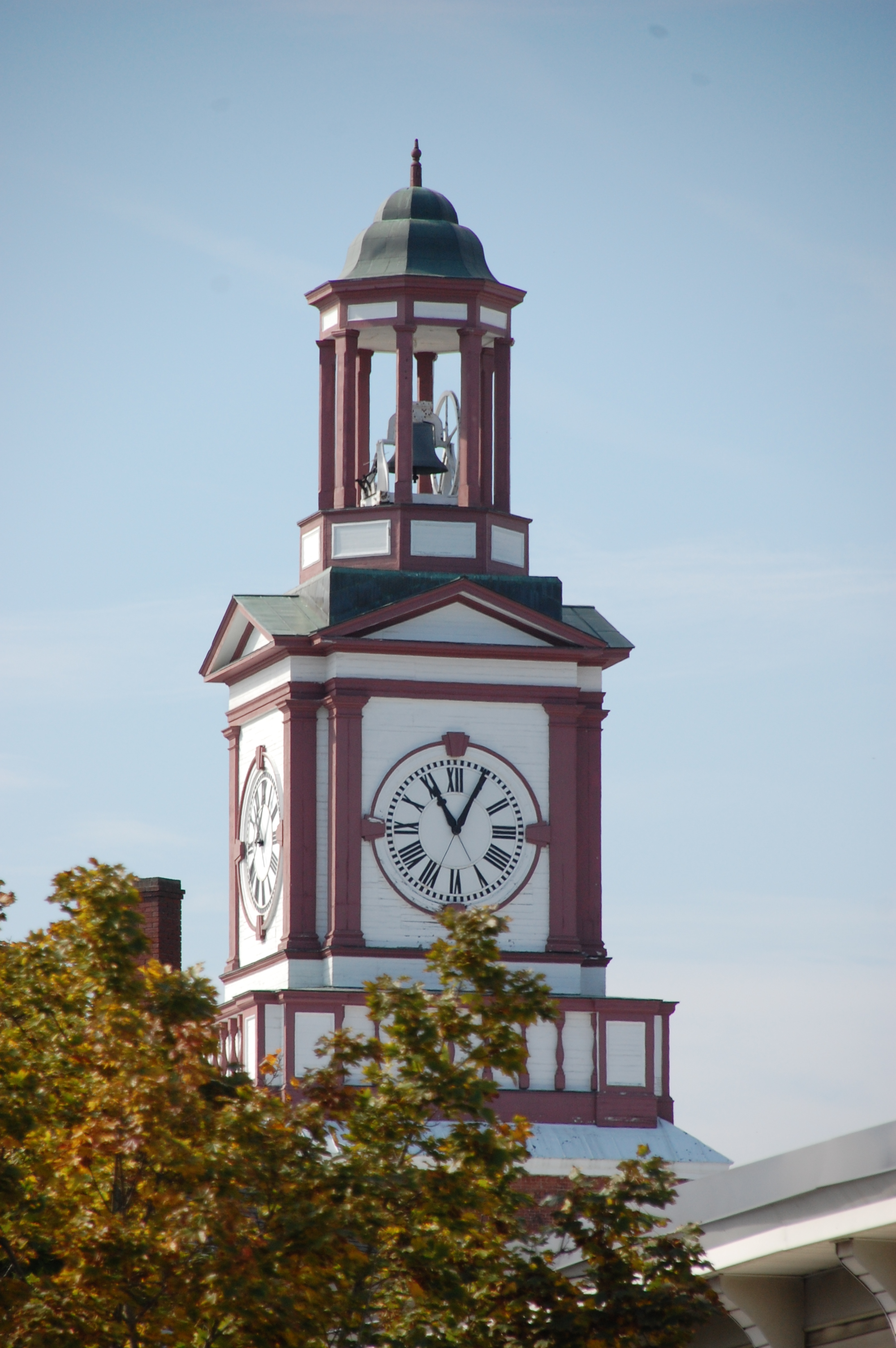
Clock tower, erected 1892 by Lorenzo Maynard, son of the founder

The Assabet Woolen Mill was originally a textile factory complex founded by Amory Maynard in 1847 near the Assabet River in the northern part of what was then Sudbury, Massachusetts. The area became the Town of Maynard in 1871. The business went bankrupt in 1898, but reopened in 1899 as part of the American Woolen Company, which expanded it. The mill ceased operation as a woolen mill in 1950. The buildings were later repurposed by Digital Equipment Corporation (DEC) as its corporate headquarters. As of 2015, the facility is host to various small business as "Mill & Main". See Maynard, Massachusetts for further details regarding the use of the dozen or so mill buildings.

== History ==
Starting in the eighteenth century, several grist mills and saw mills were constructed along the Assabet River up- and down-river from the site of the current mill building complex. In 1847 Amory Maynard and William Knight constructed the first buildings of Assabet Woolen Mill on the current site. The mill, located between its mill pond and the Assabet River, produced carpets and later wool cloth used in military uniforms during the American Civil War. The mill complex is also home to the oldest, still-working, hand-wound clock in the country (see image). The clock tower was constructed in 1892 by Lorenzo Maynard (Amory's oldest son) as a gift to the town. The weights that power the E. Howard & Co. tower clock and bell-ringing mechanisms are wound up once a week. The four clock faces have always been illuminated by electric lights.

After bankruptcy in 1898, it was purchased by American Woolen Company which modernized and expanded the facility. Textile production ended in 1950, and the complex stood empty. In 1953, several Worcester businessmen formed Maynard Industries, Inc., which purchased the property and rented space to business and industrial tenants. In 1957 the newly created Digital Equipment Corporation (Digital) rented 8,500 square feet of space in the mill complex. Digital expanded its space over time, until in 1974 it purchased the entire 1.1 million square foot complex. Maynard became known as the "Minicomputer Capital of the World". Digital remained headquartered in Maynard until 1998, but it had shuttered operations in the mill buildings in 1993. Wellesley Management purchased the property in 1998 and rented space to various business under the operating name Clock Tower Place. In 2015 "Mill & Main" acquired the mill complex and currently leases space to office and light industry businesses. New owners completed interior and exterior capital improvements at the eight-building campus in 2017.

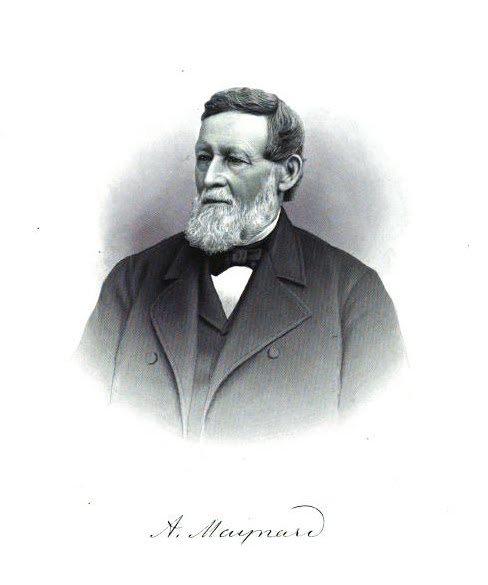
Amory Maynard mill co-founder and owner of Assabet Woolen Mill

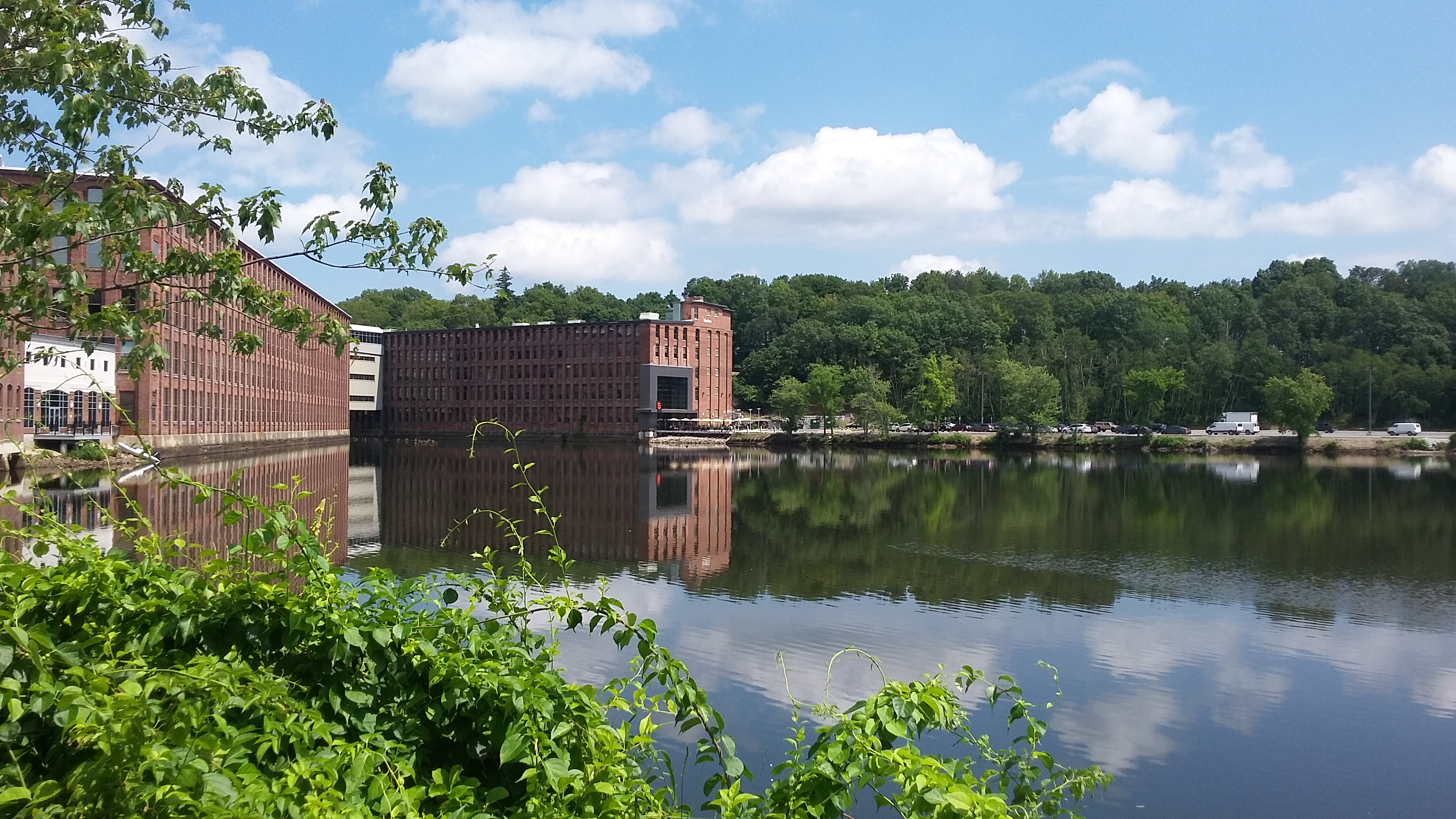
Repurposed mill buildings and mill pond

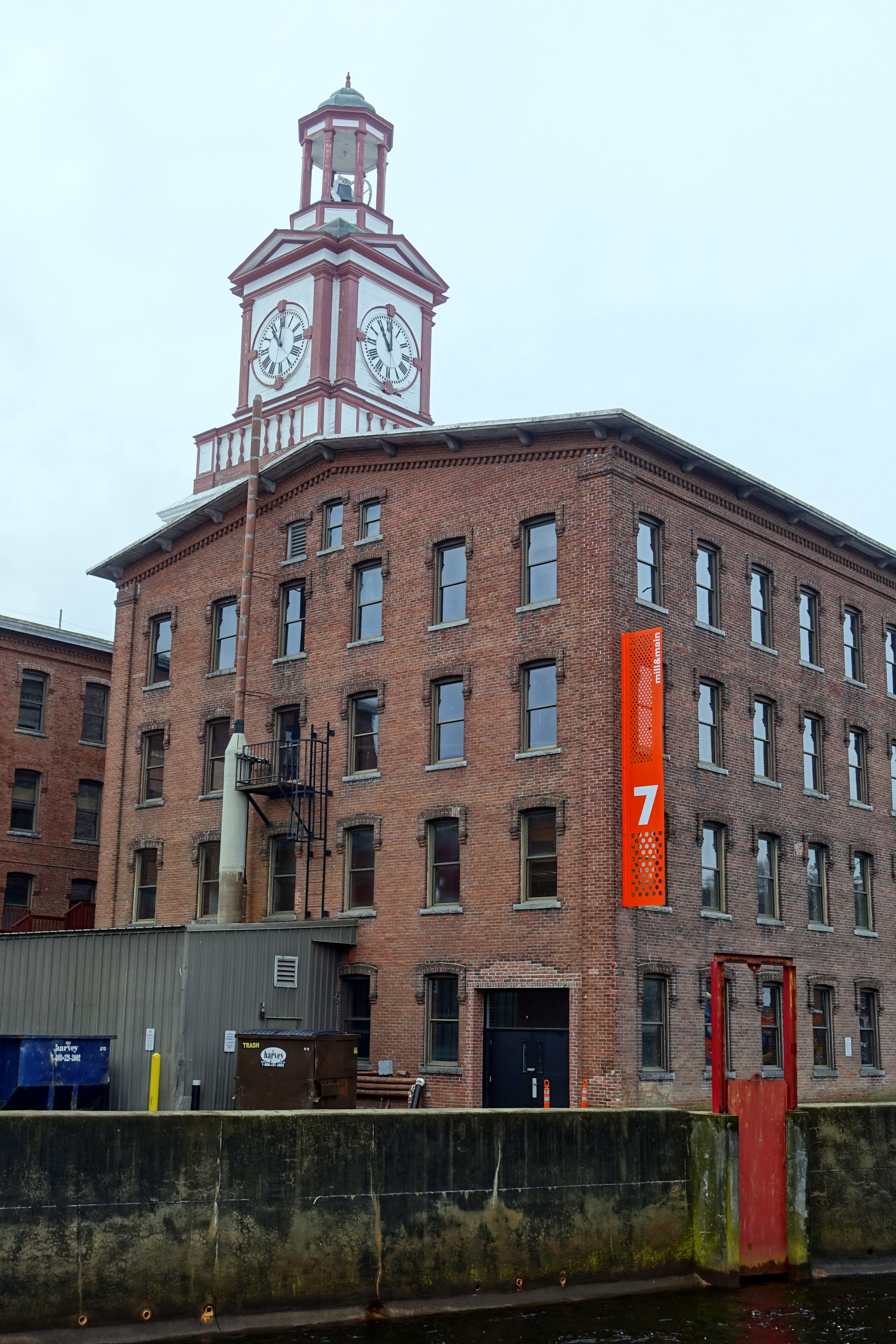
Assabet Woolen Mill, clock tower and Building 7

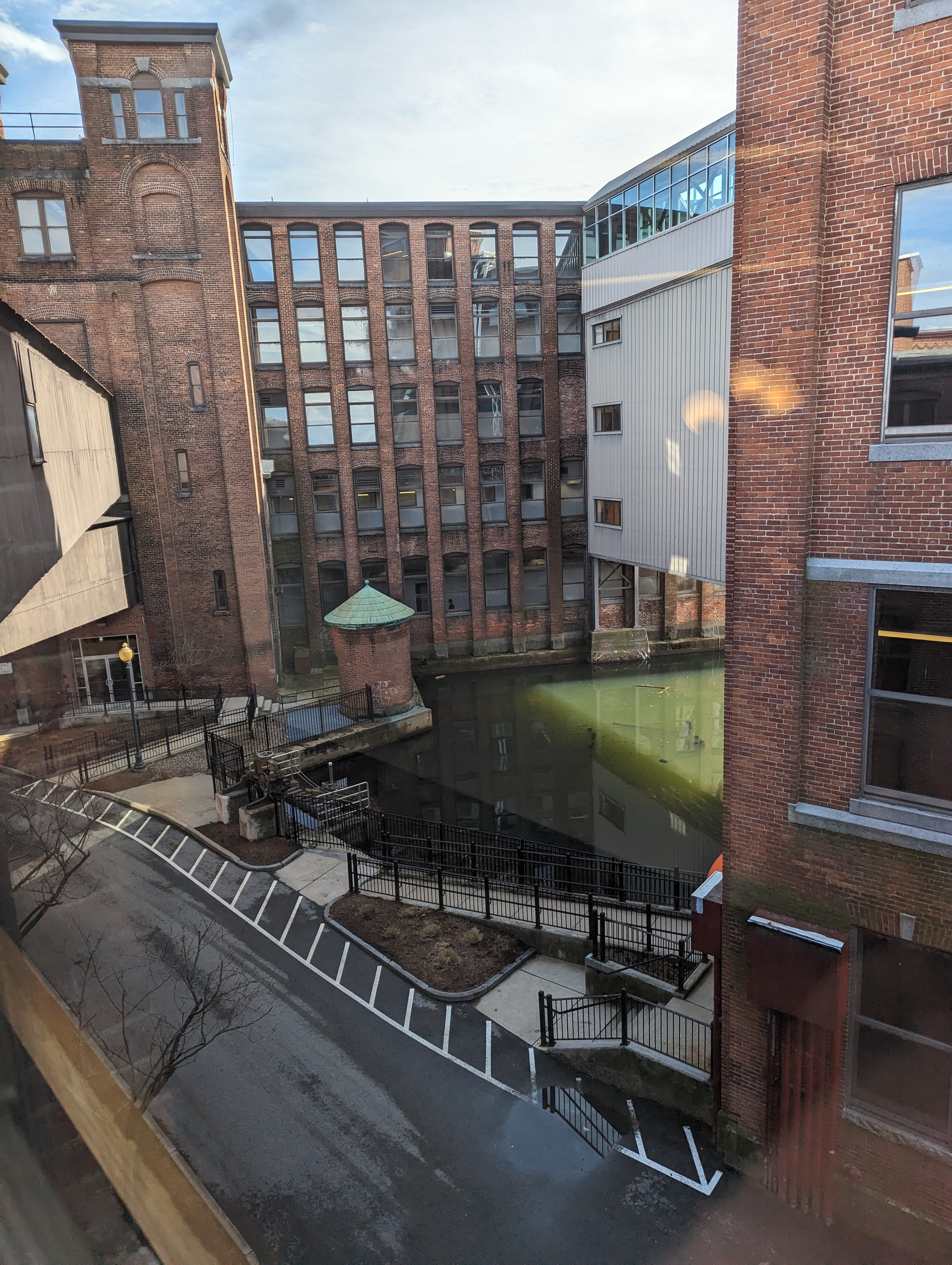
View of building 5

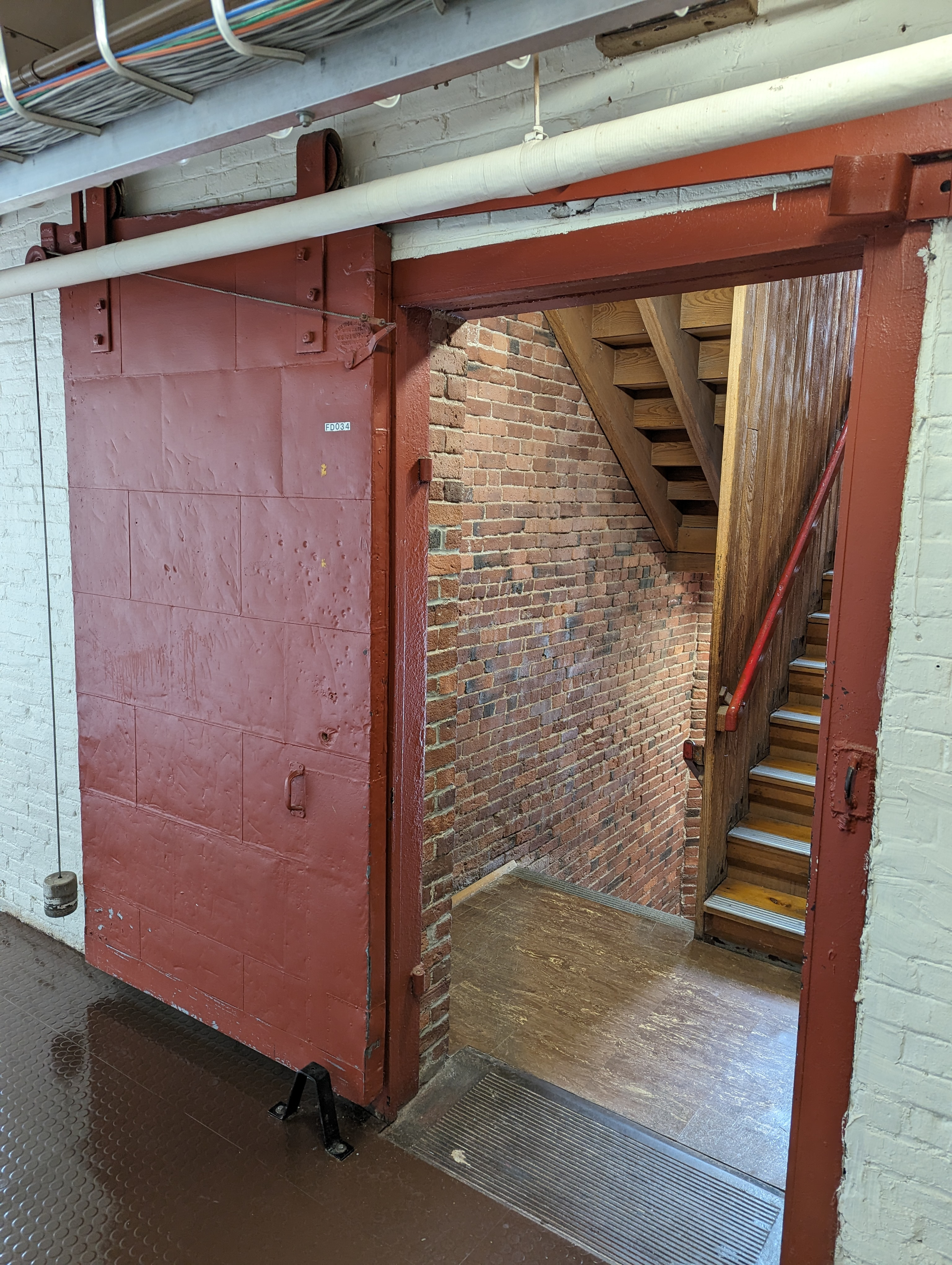
Stairwell fire door

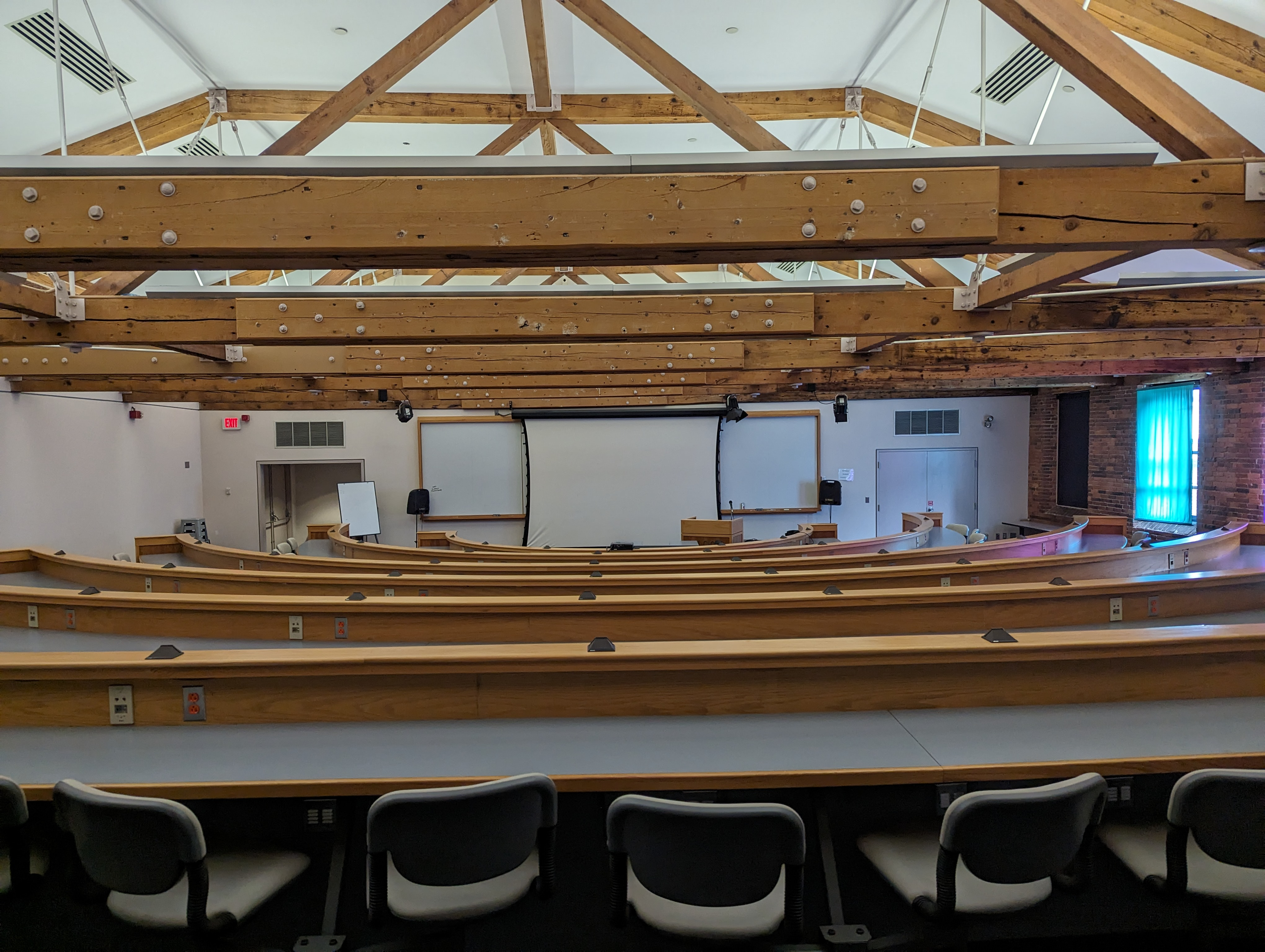
The Kenneth H Olsen Conference Center

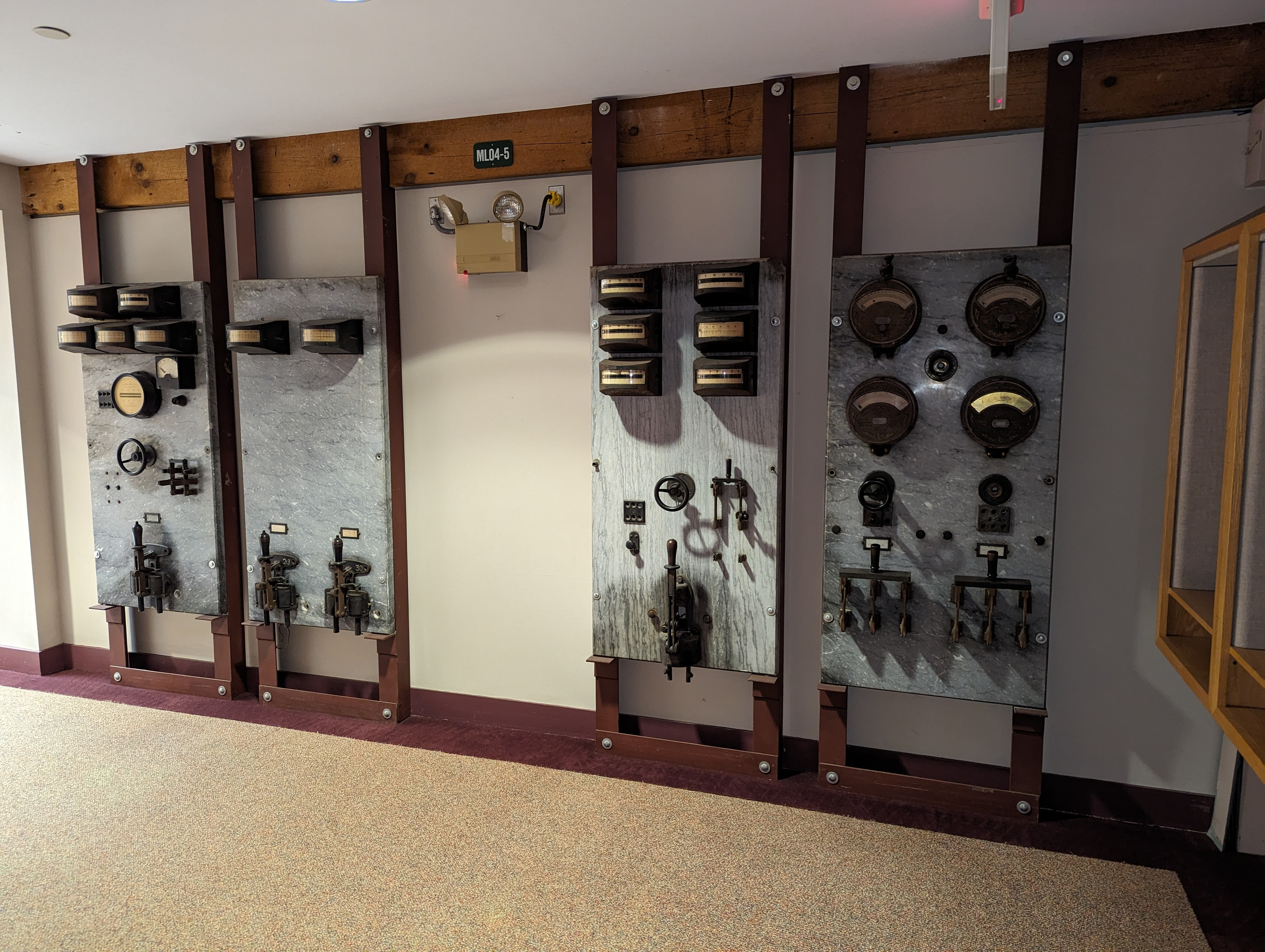
Preserved 19th century electrical controls

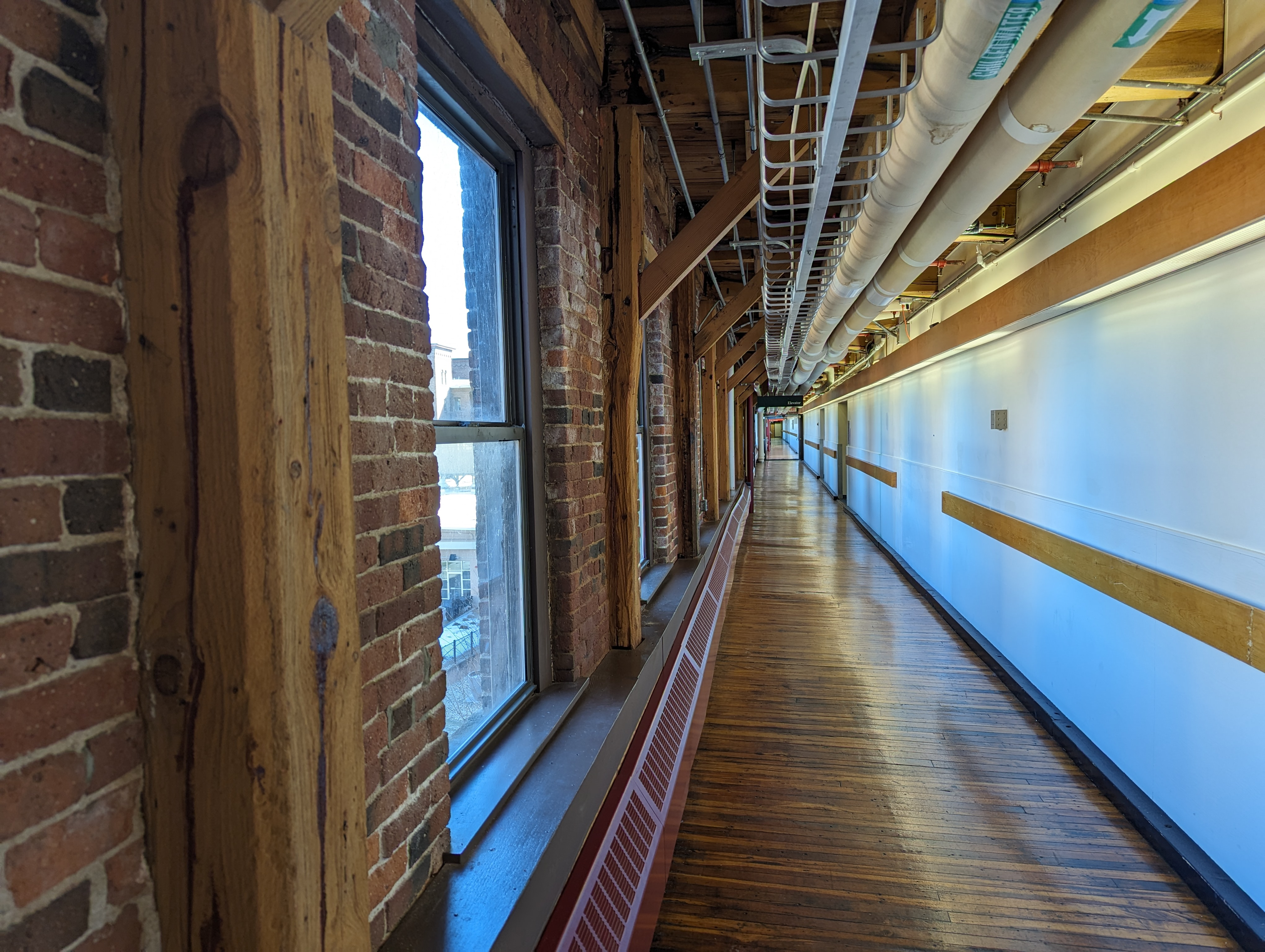
Building 2 hallway

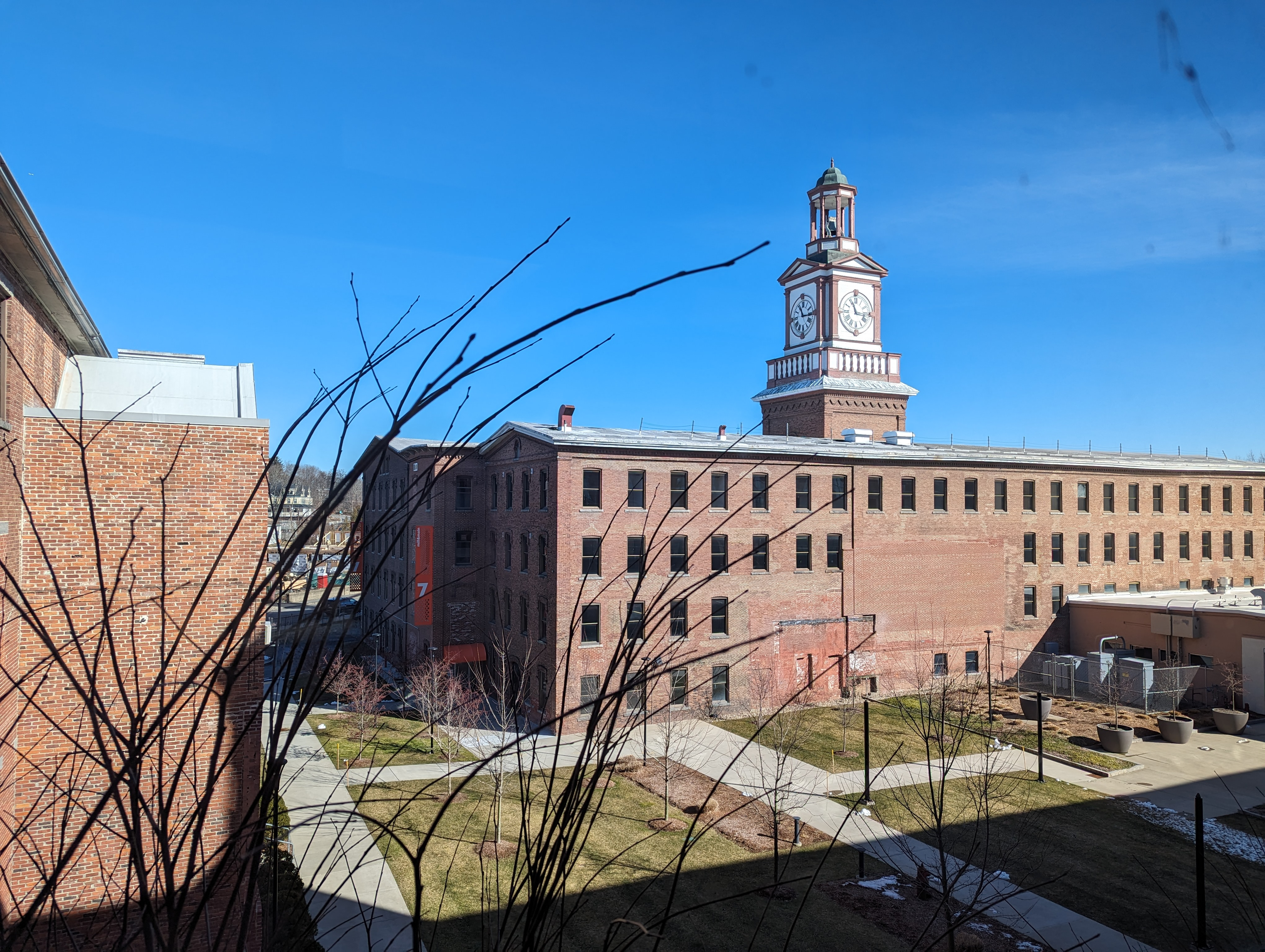
The clock tower of building 7
