= Fort Meadow Reservoir =

Reservoir in Massachusetts, United States

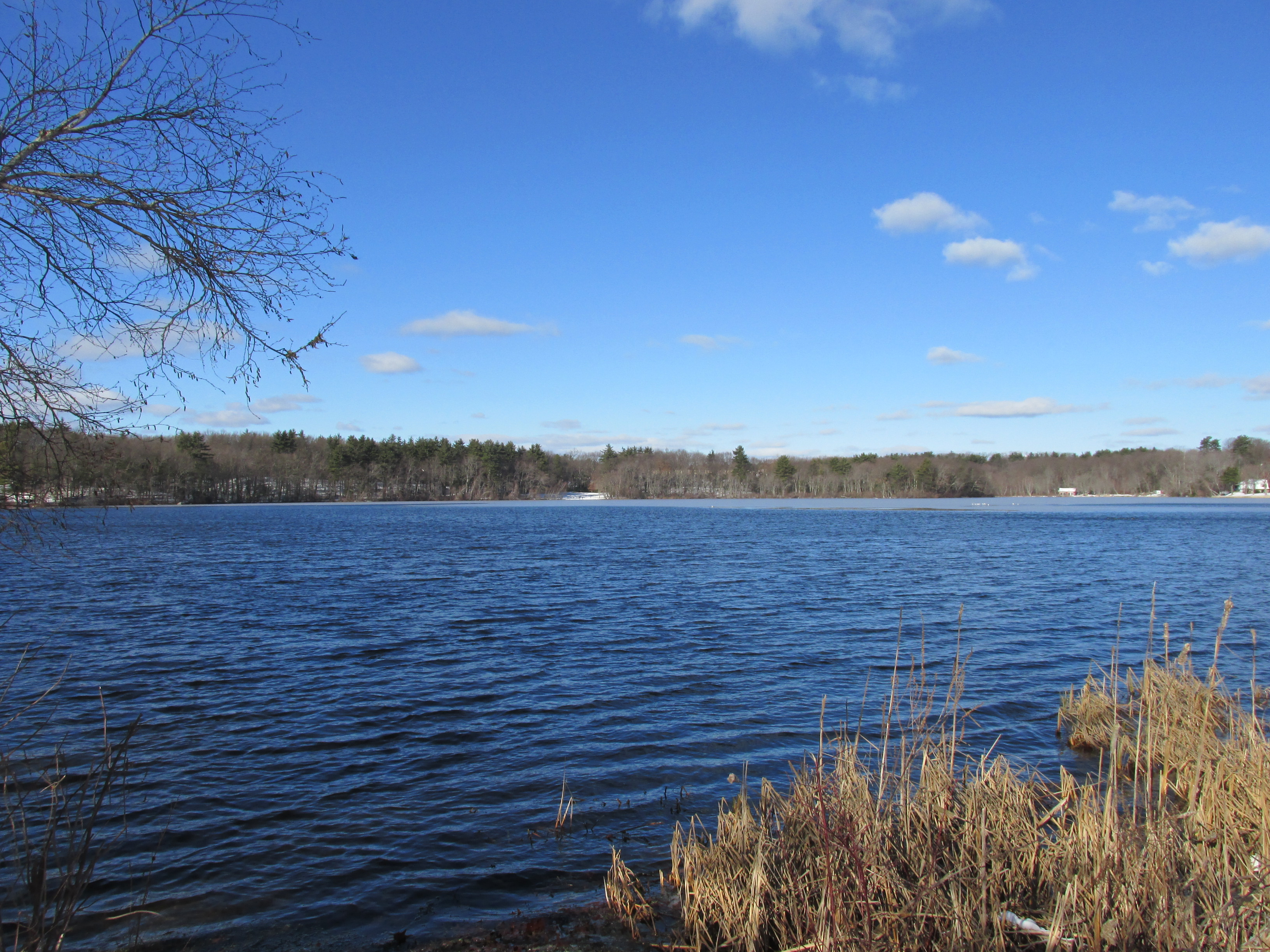
- Waterfront view

- Location within Massachusetts Location within the United States
- Location: Hudson, Massachusetts Marlborough, Massachusetts
- Coordinates: 42°22′04″N 71°33′07″W
- Max. length: 1.54 miles (2.48 km)
- Max. width: 2,300 feet (700 m)
- Surface area: 260 acres (110 ha)
- Average depth: 9 feet (2.7 m)
- Max. depth: 30 feet (9.1 m)

Fort Meadow Reservoir is a 260-acre lake in between the town of Hudson and city of Marlborough, Massachusetts, United States. At its widest point, the lake measures roughly 700 meters (2,300 ft). From end to end, it measures 1.54 miles (2,480 m) long.

Amory Maynard, the founder of Maynard, Massachusetts, originally operated a saw mill on the channel leading into Fort Meadow Reservoir before the City of Boston acquired his water rights. The Reservoir lies 250 feet (76.2 m) above sea level.

The Fort Meadow Reservoir ends at the borders of Hudson and Marlborough. The lake consists of a primary and secondary basin, separated by a narrows near the center of the two. The primary basin is split into two sections by a road.

Two public beaches are located on the secondary basin. Centennial Beach lies on the Hudson side while Memorial Beach lies on the Marlborough side.

Motorized boating is allowed, making it a popular local destination for recreation.
