= Charles L. Bartlett (mayor) =

American politician

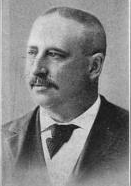

5th Mayor of Marlborough
- In office 1896–1897
- Preceded by: William N. Davenport
- Succeeded by: Eugene G. Hoitt

Member of the Common Council of the City of Marlborough

Personal details
- Born: June 20, 1851 Norwich, Vermont
- Died: April 8, 1898 (aged 46) Marlborough, Massachusetts
- Party: Republican
- Spouse(s): Emily A. Chadwick, m. 1875
- Children: Fred W. Bartlett; Charles Lester Bartlett
- Occupation: Baker; Politician

Charles Lamonso Bartlett (June 20, 1851 – April 8, 1898) was an American baker and politician in the U.S. state of Massachusetts. He served as the 5th Mayor of Marlborough, Massachusetts.

== Biography ==
Bartlett was born in Norwich, Vermont and worked as a baker. He was a member of the Common Council, and from 1896 to 1897 was the Mayor of Marlborough, Massachusetts.

Political offices
Preceded by William N. Davenport	5th Mayor of Marlborough, Massachusetts; 1896-1897	Succeeded by Eugene G. Hoitt
