= John M. Parsons =

American politician (1866–1946)

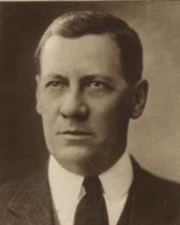

Member of the Virginia Senate
- In office January 14, 1920 – January 11, 1928
- Preceded by: M. Price Webb
- Succeeded by: Thomas L. Felts
- Constituency: 6th district (1920‍–‍1924); 14th district (1924‍–‍1928)
- In office January 8, 1908 – January 10, 1912
- Preceded by: John F. Greear
- Succeeded by: Edmund Parr
- Constituency: 6th district

Personal details
- Born: John May Parsons; September 21, 1866 Grayson, Virginia, U.S.
- Died: May 11, 1946 (aged 79) Grayson, Virginia, U.S.
- Party: Republican
- Spouse: Mary Belle Bryant

John May Parsons (September 21, 1866 – May 11, 1946) was an American Republican politician who served three terms in the Senate of Virginia.

Senate of Virginia
Preceded by M. Price Webb	Virginia Senator for the 6th District; 1908–1912; 1920–1924	Succeeded by William O. Rogers
Preceded by John F. Greear	Virginia Senator for the 6th District; 1908–1912; 1920–1924	Succeeded by Edmund Parr
Senate of Virginia
Preceded by Walter T. Oliver	Virginia Senator for the 14th District; 1924–1928	Succeeded by Thomas L. Felts
