= Samuel H. Hoge =

American politician (1860–1947)

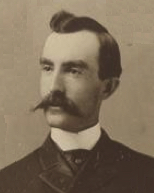
- Official portrait, 1887

Member of the Virginia House of Delegates from Patrick County
- In office December 2, 1885 – December 7, 1887
- Preceded by: Abram F. Mays
- Succeeded by: Edmund Parr

Personal details
- Born: Samuel Harris Hoge; April 6, 1860 Montgomery County, Virginia, United States
- Died: March 21, 1947 (aged 86) Roanoke, Virginia, United States
- Party: Democratic (until 1895); Republican (1895‍–‍1947)
- Spouse: Katherine Craig Taylor (m. 1889)
- Relatives: J. Hampton Hoge (brother); James C. Taylor (father-in-law)
- Education: Virginia A&M College; University of Virginia
- Occupation: Lawyer; politician

Samuel Harris Hoge (April 6, 1860 – March 21, 1947) was an American attorney and Republican politician who served one term in the Virginia House of Delegates.

== Early and family life ==
He was born in Montgomery County, Virginia, on April 6, 1860, to Daniel Howe Hoge and his wife, the former Anne Hawes DeJarnette of Caroline County, and had at least three elder brothers and two sisters.

On October 2, 1889, Hoge married Katherine Craig Taylor (1870-1956), whose father James Craig Taylor (1826–1887) had served in both houses of the Virginia General Assembly as well as Attorney General of Virginia after the American Civil War. Their son Samuel Harris Hoge Jr. (1893-1941) did not survive his parents, but their daughters did: Caroline H. Hoge, Barbara H. Hoge, Katherine D. Hoge.

== Career ==
Hoge was admitted to the Virginia bar, and also served as postmaster.

He served one term in the Virginia House of Delegates, representing Patrick County, Virginia, beginning December 2, 1885 (replacing Abram F. Mays and being replaced by Edmund Parr, who would serve many terms). Hoge later moved his legal practice to Roanoke.

Hoge was the Republican nominee for Governor of Virginia in 1925. He lost the general election to state senator Harry F. Byrd, who was transforming the Democratic political machine formerly headed by the late U.S. Senator Thomas S. Martin into the Byrd Organization, which would hold power in the Commonwealth for the next three decades.

== Death and legacy ==
Samuel Hoge Sr. died on March 21, 1947, at Roanoke's Jefferson Hospital.

Virginia House of Delegates
Preceded by Abram F. Mays	Virginia Delegate for Patrick County; 1885–1887	Succeeded by Edmund Parr
Party political offices
Preceded by Henry W. Anderson	Republican nominee for Governor of Virginia; 1925	Succeeded by William Moseley Brown
