= Henry Parsons (Massachusetts politician) =

American politician

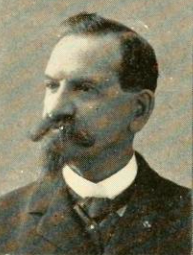

10th & 12th Mayor of Marlborough
- In office 1908–1909
- Preceded by: Edward F. Brown
- Succeeded by: John J. Shaughnessy
- In office January 2, 1905 – 1906
- Preceded by: Frederick R. S. Mildon
- Succeeded by: Edward F. Brown

Member of the Massachusetts Senate
- In office 1897–1898

Personal details
- Party: Republican

Military service
- Allegiance: United States; Union
- Branch/service: United States Army; Union Army
- Years of service: 1862–1865
- Rank: Brevet Major
- Battles/wars: American Civil War

Henry Parsons was a Massachusetts politician who served as tenth and twelfth mayor of Marlborough, Massachusetts.

== Early life ==
Parsons was naturalized an American citizen in Auburn, New York on October 12, 1865.

== Notes ==
Political offices
Preceded by Frederick R. S. Mildon	10th Mayor of Marlborough, Massachusetts; 1905-1906	Succeeded by Edward F. Brown
Preceded by Frederick R. S. Mildon	12th Mayor of Marlborough, Massachusetts; 1907-1907	Succeeded by John J. Shaughnessy
