= 1925 Virginia gubernatorial election =

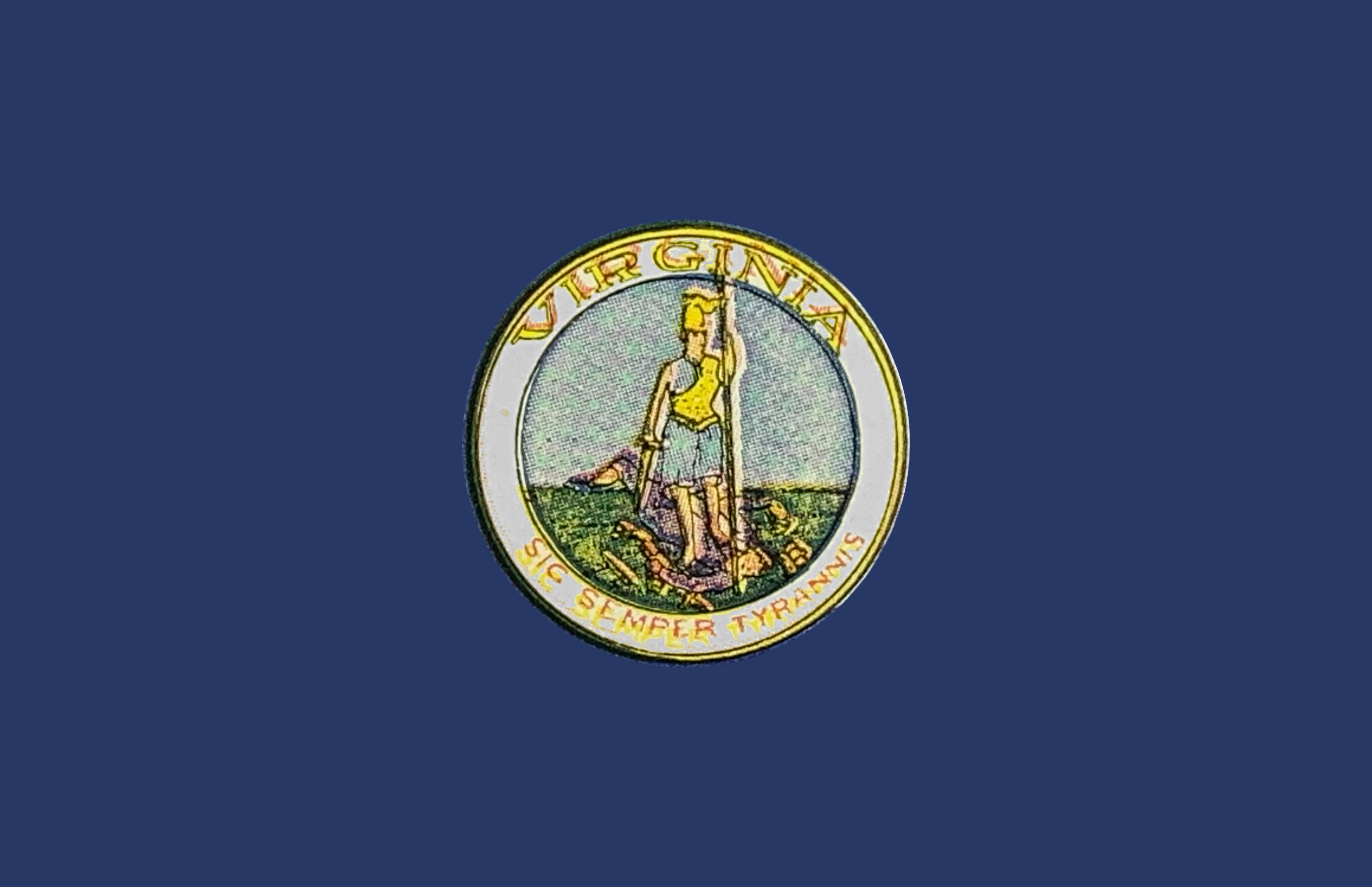
- November 3, 1925
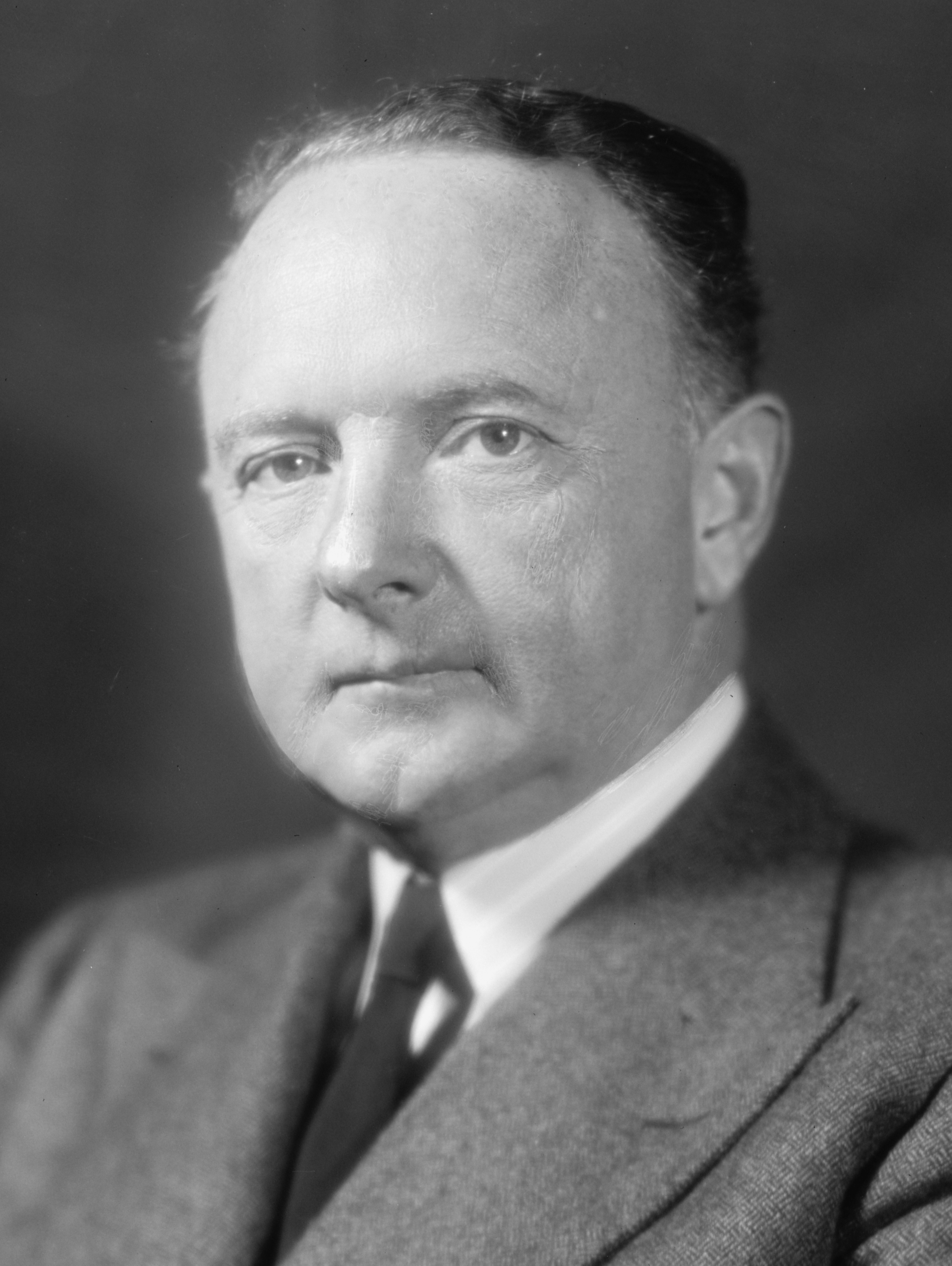

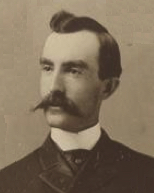
Nominee	Harry F. Byrd	S. Harris Hoge
Party	Democratic	Republican
Popular vote	107,378	37,592
Percentage	74.07%	25.93%
- County and independent city results Byrd: 50–60% 60–70% 70–80% 80–90% >90% Hoge: 50–60%
Governor before election
E. Lee Trinkle
Democratic
Elected Governor
Harry F. Byrd
Democratic

The 1925 Virginia gubernatorial election was held on November 3, 1925, to elect the governor of Virginia.

Incumbent Governor Elbert Lee Trinkle, Democrat was ineligible to run for re-election due to term limits.

The Democratic Nominee, State Senator Harry F. Byrd defeated the Republican Nominee, former State Delegate S. Harris Hoge.

== Democratic primary ==
=== Candidates ===
- Harry F. Byrd, State Senator
- G. Walter Mapp, State Senator

=== Results ===
1925 Virginia Gubernatorial Election Democratic Primary
Candidate	Votes	Percentage
Harry F. Byrd	107,317	61.4%
G. Walter Mapp	67,573	38.6%
Total	174,896	100%

== General Election ==
=== Candidates ===
- Harry F. Byrd, State Senator (D)
- S. Harris Hoge, Former State Delegate (R)

1925 Virginia Gubernatorial Election
Party	Candidate	Votes	Percentage
Democratic	Harry F. Byrd	107,378	74.07%
Republican	S. Harris Hoge	37,592	25.93%
Total		144,970	100%
