= Charles F. McCarthy =

American politician

Charles Francis McCarthy
- McCarthy c. 1908

Member of the Massachusetts Senate from the 5th Middlesex district
- In office 1912–1913
- Preceded by: Roger Sherman Hoar

Member of the Massachusetts House of Representatives from the 9th Middlesex district
- In office 1908–1910

18th Mayor of Marlborough
- In office 1918–1920
- Preceded by: William T. Pine
- Succeeded by: Andrew Patrick Sullivan

Personal details
- Born: August 15, 1875 Marlborough, Massachusetts
- Died: February 13, 1938 (aged 62)
- Party: Democratic
- Profession: Journalist

Military service
- Branch/service: Company F, Sixth Massachusetts Regiment
- Years of service: May 18, 1898—January 21, 1899
- Rank: Corporal
- Battles/wars: Spanish–American War • Puerto Rico

Charles Francis McCarthy (August 15, 1876 – February 13, 1938) was an American newspaper reporter and politician who served in the Massachusetts Great and General Court and as the eighteenth Mayor of Marlborough, Massachusetts.

== Spanish American War ==
McCarthy served from May 18, 1898 – January 21, 1899 in Company F., Sixth Massachusetts Regiment during the Spanish–American War, attaining the rank of corporal. McCarthy was deployed along with his regiment to Puerto Rico where they disembarked on July 25, 1898. McCarthy was mustered out of service on January 21, 1899.

== Massachusetts House of Representatives ==
McCarthy served as a Democrat to represent Marlborough in the Ninth Middlesex District of the Massachusetts House of Representatives. While in the House, McCarthy served on the Mercantile Affairs Committee.

== Massachusetts Senate ==
McCarthy served in the Massachusetts State Senate from 1912 to 1914.

== Massachusetts Constitutional Convention of 1917 ==
In 1916 the Massachusetts legislature and electorate approved the calling of a Constitutional Convention. In May 1917, McCarthy was elected to serve as a member of the Massachusetts Constitutional Convention of 1917, representing the 9th Middlesex District of the Massachusetts House of Representatives. McCarthy served on the convention's committee on Military Affairs.

McCarthy is reported as having made a Memorial Day address at the Town Hall on May 29, 1933.

== See also ==
- 134th Massachusetts General Court (1913)

== Notes ==
Political offices
Preceded by William T. Pine	18th Mayor of Marlborough, Massachusetts; 1918 - 1920	Succeeded by Andrew Patrick Sullivan
