= William T. Pine =

William Thomas Pine

17th Mayor of Marlborough
- In office 1917–1917/unknown

Personal details
- Born: June 23, 1873
- Party: Republican
- Spouse: Elizabeth Jane
- Profession: Butcher

William Thomas Pine was an American politician who served as Mayor of Marlborough, Massachusetts.

== Notes ==
Political offices
Preceded by Louis Farley	Mayor of Marlborough, Massachusetts; 1917	Succeeded by Charles F. McCarthy
