= Harry F. Byrd =

American politician, newspaper publisher, and segregationist (1887–1966)

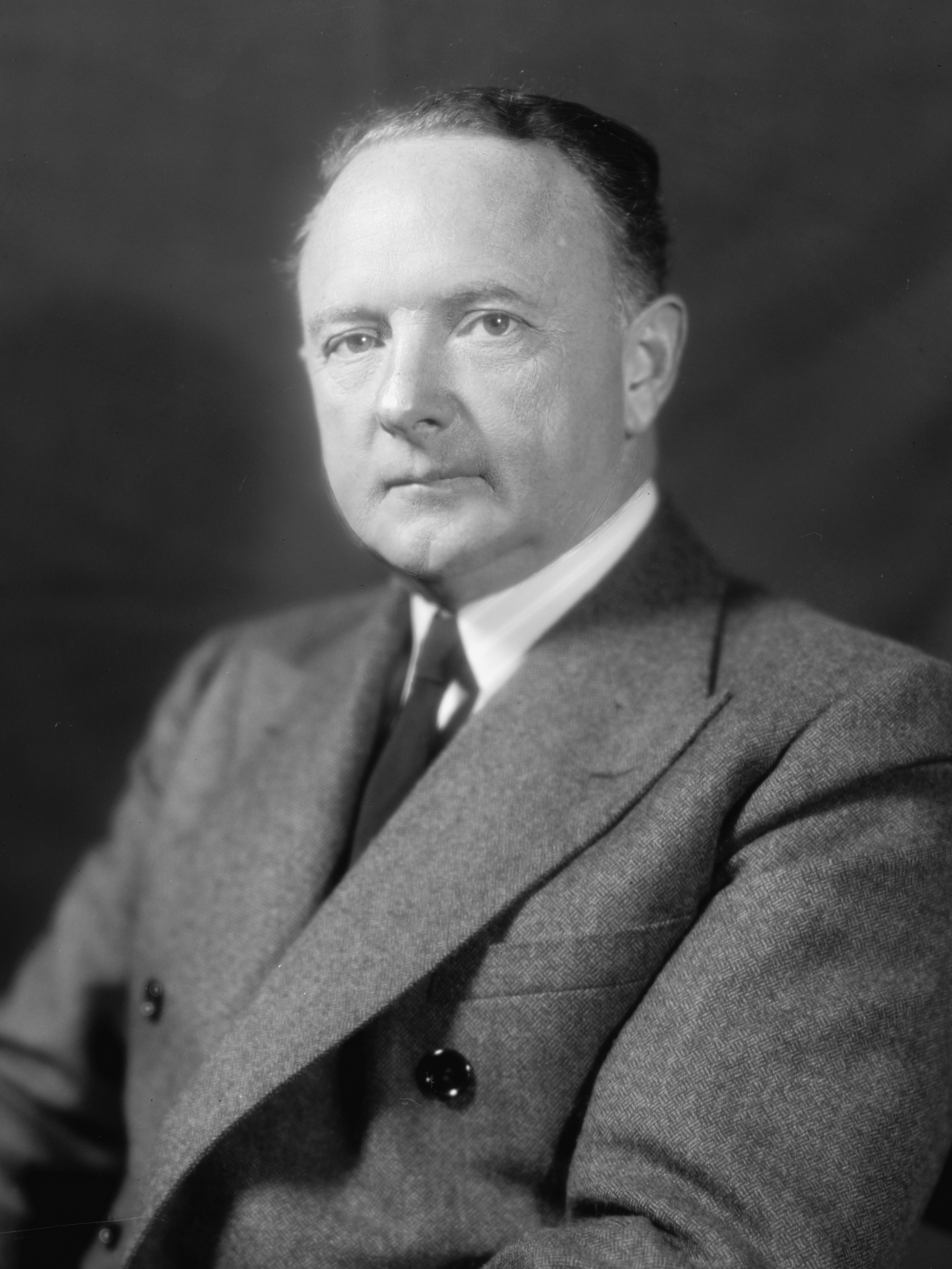
- Byrd, c. 1926–1930

United States Senator from Virginia
- In office March 4, 1933 – November 10, 1965
- Preceded by: Claude A. Swanson
- Succeeded by: Harry F. Byrd Jr.
Committee chairmanships
Chair of the Senate Finance Committee
In office January 3, 1955 – January 3, 1965
Preceded by	Eugene Millikin
Succeeded by	Russell Long
Chair of the Senate Rules Committee
In office January 3, 1941 – January 3, 1947
Preceded by	Matthew Neely
Succeeded by	Wayland Brooks

50th Governor of Virginia
- In office February 1, 1926 – January 15, 1930
- Lieutenant: Junius Edgar West
- Preceded by: Elbert Lee Trinkle
- Succeeded by: John Garland Pollard

Member of the Virginia Senate
- In office January 12, 1916 – January 13, 1926
- Preceded by: Frank S. Tavenner
- Succeeded by: Joseph S. Denny
- Constituency: 10th district (1916–1924); 26th district (1924–1926)

Personal details
- Born: Harry Flood Byrd; June 10, 1887 Martinsburg, West Virginia, U.S.
- Died: October 20, 1966 (aged 79) Berryville, Virginia, U.S.
- Resting place: Mount Hebron Cemetery
- Party: Democratic
- Spouse: Anne Douglas Beverley (m. 1913; died 1964)
- Children: 4, including Harry Jr.
- Parent: Richard E. Byrd Sr. (father)
- Relatives: Richard E. Byrd Jr. (brother)

Harry Flood Byrd Sr. (June 10, 1887 – October 20, 1966) was an American newspaper publisher, politician, and leader of the Democratic Party in Virginia for four decades as head of a political faction that became known as the Byrd Organization. Byrd served as Virginia's governor from 1926 until 1930, then represented the state as a U.S. senator from 1933 until 1965 and is the longest serving senator from Virginia with his tenure lasting for over 32 years and 8 months.

He came to lead the conservative coalition in the Senate, and opposed President Franklin D. Roosevelt, largely blocking most liberal legislation after 1937. His son Harry Jr. succeeded him as U.S. senator, but ran as an independent following the decline of the Byrd Organization.

Byrd succeeded to what had been the Virginia Democratic Party organization of U.S. senator Thomas Staples Martin, who died in 1919. Elected the 50th governor of Virginia in 1925, initially Byrd reorganized and modernized Virginia's government. His political machine dominated state politics for much of the first half of the 20th century.

Byrd was vehemently opposed to racial desegregation of the public schools, and was the leader of massive resistance, a campaign of opposition to the U.S. Supreme Court decisions in Brown v. Board of Education that led to closure of some public schools in Virginia in the 1950s. Students who were denied their education in several Virginia counties became known as the "lost generation". According to Clarence M. Dunnaville Jr., Byrd was a racist and avowed white separatist. Although Byrd paid his black and white workers similarly, he was vehemently opposed to racial desegregation even early in the New Deal, and later opposed Presidents Harry S. Truman and John F. Kennedy as well as losing presidential candidate Adlai Stevenson, despite all being fellow Democrats, because unlike Byrd they opposed racial discrimination within the federal workforce. The Byrd Organization also benefited from limiting the political participation of blacks and poor whites in Virginia by means of poll taxes and literacy tests, but managed to defeat opposition ranging from New Deal governor James H. Price to gubernatorial and senatorial candidate Francis Pickens Miller.

Although Byrd never announced himself as a presidential candidate, he received votes in the 1956 presidential election and 15 electoral votes in the 1960 election. In 1966, Byrd died at the age of 79 from a brain tumor, after being in a coma for four months.

== Early life and education ==
Harry Flood Byrd was born in Martinsburg, West Virginia, in 1887 (just two weeks after future fellow U.S. senator Absalom Willis Robertson was born in the same community). His parents, Eleanor Bolling (Flood) and Richard Evelyn Byrd Sr., moved the young family to Winchester, Virginia, the same year.

Young Harry Byrd's father became wealthy as an apple grower in the Shenandoah Valley, and publisher of the Winchester Star newspaper. He represented Winchester in the Virginia House of Delegates, and served as that body's Speaker from 1908 until 1914. He was the United States Attorney for the Western District of Virginia from 1914 until 1920. Harry initially attended the public schools, but received most of his education from the private Shenandoah Valley Academy in Winchester.

=== Genealogy and family relations ===
Byrd's ancestors included the First Families of Virginia. His paternal ancestors included Col Benjamin Harrison of Brandon Plantation, William Byrd II of Westover Plantation (who established Richmond) and Robert "King" Carter of Corotoman. His maternal ancestors included John Rolfe and Pocahontas. His ancestor William Byrd III squandered the Byrd family's once vast fortune through gambling and bad investments.

One younger brother was Naval aviator and polar explorer Admiral Richard Evelyn Byrd (1888–1957). His other younger brother, Thomas Bolling Byrd (1890–1968), became an infantry captain during World War I. Their uncle Henry De La Warr Flood served in the House of Representatives of the U.S. Congress from Appomattox County from 1901 to 1921. Another uncle from Appomattox County, Joel West Flood, served as that county's Commonwealth Attorney (1919 to 1932), in the U.S. Congress (beginning in 1932 to fill the vacancy caused by the death of Henry St. George Tucker), and as a state appellate Judge (of the Virginia Fifth Circuit, based in Richmond, from 1940 to 1964).

=== Influence on character ===
Born only twenty-two years after the end of the American Civil War, Byrd grew up in an era when "the Shenandoah Valley was still a place of genteel poverty ... Harry Byrd never lacked food, but he had no money for luxuries. No one had any money. If a man got into debt, there was small chance of getting out of it."

Even worse in Byrd's eyes was the dilemma of the state itself, which was also heavily in debt during Byrd's youth. Before the Civil War, Virginia had taken on debt to help finance many internal public improvements (canals, turnpikes, and railroads) through the Virginia Board of Public Works. Most had been destroyed during the War, although the debt remained and the infrastructure needed to be rebuilt to get crops and goods to market. Virginia's first postwar legislature had affirmed those debts at original terms (highly favorable to bondholders, which by then were mostly out-of-state purchasers at rates a small fraction of par value). Some related to improvements in the area that separated during the war to form the new State of West Virginia; those were litigated for decades until the United States Supreme Court ruled in 1915 that West Virginia owed Virginia $12,393,929.50. After the Reconstruction period, most of Virginia's governors insisted upon paying state bondholders, rather than pay for public education (newly added in Virginia Constitution of 1869) or other government services. The Readjuster Party, which briefly challenged the Conservative Party of Virginia (the latter of which became the Virginia Democratic Party), advocated adjusting the terms of the prewar bonds, but had a relatively brief lifespan. Thus, the issue of Virginia's public debt was far from resolved during Byrd's formative years.

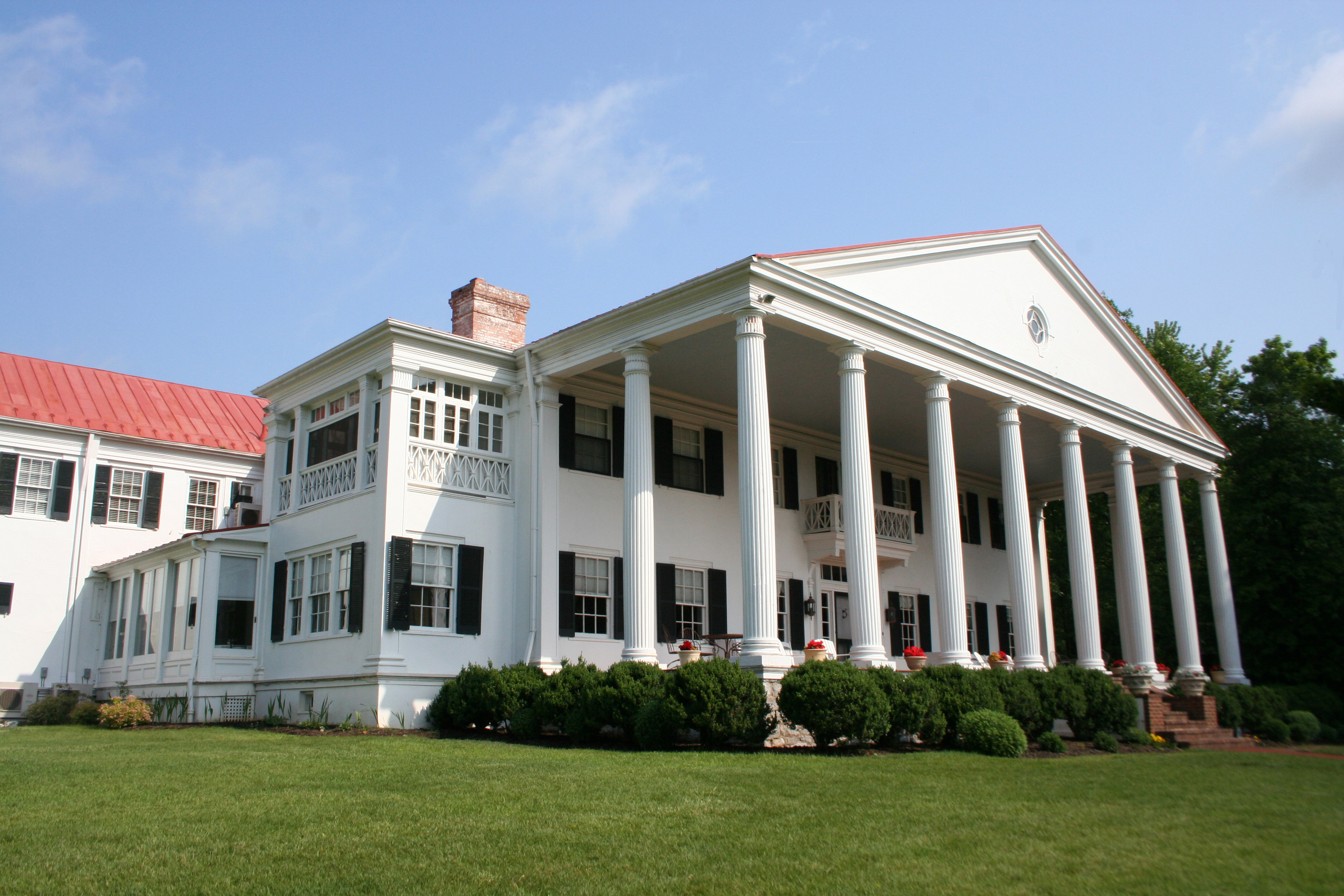
Rosemont Manor in Berryville, Virginia; Byrd's home from 1929 until his death

=== Marriage and family ===
Byrd married Anne Douglas Beverley, a childhood friend, on October 7, 1913. They lived with her parents in Winchester until 1916, when he built a log cabin, named Westwood, in Berryville at a family-owned orchard, and they moved there. The cabin was constructed from chestnut logs and remains one of the few examples of natural chestnut bark existing in the United States due to the chestnut blight. The Byrds had three sons: Harry F. Byrd Jr., Bradshaw Beverley Byrd, and Richard Byrd, and one daughter, Westwood Beverly Byrd. In 1926, Byrd purchased Rosemont Manor, an estate outside Berryville, adjacent to the family apple orchards. The family moved into the antebellum mansion in 1929, at the end of Byrd's term as governor, after some renovations. The couple remained married for 53 years. His wife Anne Douglas Beverly died in 1964.

== Business career ==
As a businessman, Byrd had several operations: publishing newspapers, running a local turnpike, and selling apples and apple products.

In 1903, Harry Byrd took over his father's newspaper, the Winchester Star. Under his father's ownership, it came to owe $2500 (equivalent to $90,000 in 2025) to its newsprint supplier, the Antietam Paper Company. The company refused to ship more newsprint on credit, so Byrd cut a deal to make daily cash payments in return for ownership. As Byrd would later say, "when you have to hunt for them that way, you get to know how many cents there really are in a dollar." He eventually bought the Harrisonburg Daily News-Record and several other papers in the Shenandoah Valley. His family operated these papers until April 1, 2018, when they were sold to the Ogden Newspapers Inc. of Wheeling, West Virginia.

Thus started what would become Byrd's famous "pay-as-you-go" policy. He developed a lifelong aversion to borrowing money and any indebtedness. "I stand for strict economy in governmental affairs," Byrd proclaimed. "The State of Virginia is similar to a great business corporation ... and should be conducted with the same efficiency and economy as any private business." In a fifty-year political career, no statement of Byrd's ever more succinctly spelled out his view of government.

In 1907, he founded The Evening Journal in nearby Martinsburg, West Virginia. He sold the paper in 1912 to associate Max von Schlegell.

In 1908, at the age of 21, he became president of The Valley Turnpike Company, overseeing the Valley Turnpike, a 93-mile (150-km) toll road between Winchester and Staunton. Earning $33 a month, he was required to drive the entire route at least twice a month to inspect it and arrange any repairs. As automobile traffic increased, he ensured road conditions were maintained within the available revenues. He held that office for seven years until his election to state office.

Byrd also owned extensive apple orchards in the Shenandoah Valley and an apple-packing operation which was among the largest on the East Coast. He later pointed out that he paid his African-American workers the same wages as his white farm workers.

In the 1950s, Edward P. Morgan's assistant visited Byrd's Northern Virginia farm during the apple harvest and was outraged by the living conditions of the migrant workers. This prompted Morgan to take up the issue of migrant labor in his CBS Radio Network commentaries. Producer Fred W. Friendly then prompted his close associate Edward R. Murrow to produce the television documentary Harvest of Shame on this issue.

== Virginia politics ==
In 1915, while still heading the Valley Turnpike Company, at the age of 28, Byrd was elected to the Virginia Senate. That election was to begin his 50 years of service in various roles in the state and federal government.

At the Virginia State Capitol in Richmond, as a new state senator, Byrd was initially a progressive with an early interest in road improvements. He was a member of the Senate Committee on Roads, the Finance Committee, the Steering Committee, the Committee on Privileges and Elections, and the Committee of Schools and Colleges. He advocated a tax on gasoline as a fair method of raising revenue for road construction.

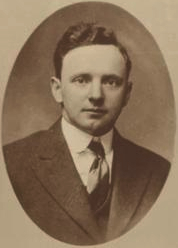
Byrd as a state senator during the 1916 General Assembly

However, he first came to prominence in 1922, when he led a fight against using bonded indebtedness as a method to pay for new roads. He feared the state would sacrifice future flexibility by committing too many resources to paying off construction debt. In 1923, Byrd was sued by the Virginia Highway Contractors Association for the sum of $100,000 for "false, scandalous, defamatory and malicious libel." The court dismissed the suit, stating the criticism was legal, imposing all costs upon the association. The publicity helped him to be elected Governor of Virginia in November 1925, easily defeating Republican S. Harris Hoge in the general election.

In 1923, he became a member of the Virginia Society of the Sons of the American Revolution as a descendant of patriot Benjamin Harrison.

As governor, serving a term from 1926 to 1930, Byrd pushed through constitutional amendments that streamlined the state government and allowed for more efficient use of tax dollars. He also made property taxes solely a county responsibility. When it was obvious that increased spending on road construction was not enough to "get Virginia out of the mud," he pushed through a secondary roads bill that gave the state responsibility for maintaining county roads. These measures made Byrd seem like a New South progressive at first. However, many of his measures were more to the benefit of rural areas more interested in low taxes than better services. He instituted a "pay as you go" approach to spending, in which no state money was spent until enough taxes and fees came in to pay for it. Highways and tourism were his primary pursuits, says his biographer. "He advocated building roads to state shrines such as Jamestown and Monticello and called for historical markers along roadways, the first of which appeared in Fredericksburg. He held regional meetings to bring about closer cooperation between state and county road officials, prophesying that the road system could be completed within ten years through such cooperation... A tour of the highway system convinced him of the progress being made in extending the arterial network. Indeed, over 2,000 miles would be added to the system during Byrd's governorship, 1,787 of these miles in 1928. Road building was one way to keep the voters happy and prove the efficacy of pay-as-you-go."

While he was governor, Byrd built up contacts with the "courthouse cliques" in most of Virginia's counties. He curried support from the five constitutional officers in those counties (sheriff, Commonwealth's attorney, clerk of the court, county treasurer, and commissioner of revenue). This formed the basis of the Byrd Organization, which dominated Virginia politics well into the 1960s. They carefully vetted candidates for statewide office, and Byrd only made an endorsement, or "nod," after consulting with them. Without his "nod," no one could win statewide office in Virginia. While he was governor, he shortened the ballot so that only three officials ran statewide: the governor, lieutenant governor and attorney general. This limited opportunities to challenge the candidates that he wanted to run. His secondary roads bill in 1932, which became known as the Byrd Road Act, did not apply to the state's independent cities.

Education was not on his agenda, and state spending for public schools remained very low until the late 1960s. Byrd became one of the most vocal proponents of maintaining policies of racial segregation. He authored and signed the "Southern Manifesto" condemning the 1954 U.S. Supreme Court decision in Brown v. Board of Education. His call for "massive resistance" against desegregation of public schools led to many Virginia schools closing rather than be forced to integrate.

He helped draft a series of laws, known as the Stanley Plan, to implement his "massive resistance" policy. This led to closure of some public school systems in Virginia between 1959 and 1964, most notably a five-year gap in public education in Prince Edward County, Virginia.

== National politics ==
In 1933 Byrd was appointed to fill a vacancy in the United States Senate; he won reelection as a Democrat in 1933, 1934, 1940, 1946, 1952, 1958, and 1964. Byrd and his colleague Carter Glass invoked senatorial courtesy to stop President Franklin Delano Roosevelt's nomination of Floyd H. Roberts to a federal judgeship in Virginia in 1939. Byrd broke with Roosevelt and became an opponent of the New Deal, but he was an internationalist and strongly supported Roosevelt's foreign policy. As war loomed in 1941 Congress approved his proposal for a joint House–Senate committee to look into ways of eliminating nonessential expenditures. By late September, the Joint Committee on Reduction of Non-essential Federal Expenditures was in operation with Senator Byrd as chairman; it built his national reputation as an economizer.

By the 1950s Byrd was one of the most influential senators, serving on the Armed Services Committee, and later as chairman of the Finance Committee. He often broke with the Democratic Party line, going so far as to refuse to endorse the re-election of liberal President Harry S. Truman in 1948. He also refused to endorse Adlai Stevenson in 1952. He voted against public works bills, including the Interstate Highway System, and played a key role in the passing of the 1964 Revenue Act. He had blocked the bill until President Lyndon Johnson agreed to decrease the total budget to under $100 billion. Subsequently, he helped push the Act through.

Byrd retired from the Senate for health reasons in November 1965. His son, Harry F. Byrd Jr., was appointed his successor.

== U.S. presidential candidate ==
Having supported Al Smith, the Democratic governor of New York, in the 1928 U.S. presidential campaign, Byrd was selected by the Virginia Democratic Convention as a favorite son for the 1932 presidential nomination. According to the American political historian Steve Neal, at one point during the Democratic National Convention Byrd was offered the vice-presidential slot in exchange for instructing his 24 delegates to vote for Franklin D. Roosevelt, but declined because he believed he had a chance of winning the presidential nomination. Roosevelt won on the fourth ballot.

Although Byrd never again formally sought the presidency nor became his party's candidate, Southern Democrats drafted him in several campaigns between 1944 and 1960. At the 1944 Democratic National Convention, Southern delegates opposed to Roosevelt's New Deal and racial policies nominated Byrd as the party's presidential candidate. He was nominated by Ruth Nooney of Florida, who said she did so without his knowledge or consent. He won 89 delegate votes to Roosevelt's 1,086 (James Farley of New York got one vote). All the convention delegates from Louisiana, Mississippi and Virginia, and 12 of the 36 delegates from Texas voted for Byrd. In 1952, both the Constitution Party and the America First Party nominated Byrd for vice president, and Douglas MacArthur for president, without the consent of either. The slate got 17,205 votes nationwide. In 1956, the year that Byrd initiated the "massive resistance" campaign, the States' Rights Party of Kentucky named Byrd as a presidential candidate. He received 2,657 votes in that state; in South Carolina, in the same election, he received 88,509 votes as the choice of an independent (i.e. unpledged) slate of electors with the endorsement of former governor James Byrnes and Senator Strom Thurmond.

Electoral College 1960 map

In 1960, Byrd received 15 votes in the Electoral College: eight unpledged electors from Mississippi (all of that state's electoral votes), six unpledged electors from Alabama (the other 5 electoral votes from that state went to John F. Kennedy), and a faithless elector from Oklahoma (the other 7 electoral votes from that state went to Richard Nixon).

== Death ==
Shortly after leaving office, Byrd died in 1966 from a brain tumor; he had been in a coma for four months. He was 79 years of age and had been a senator for over 32 years. He was interred in Mount Hebron Cemetery in Winchester.

== Legacy ==
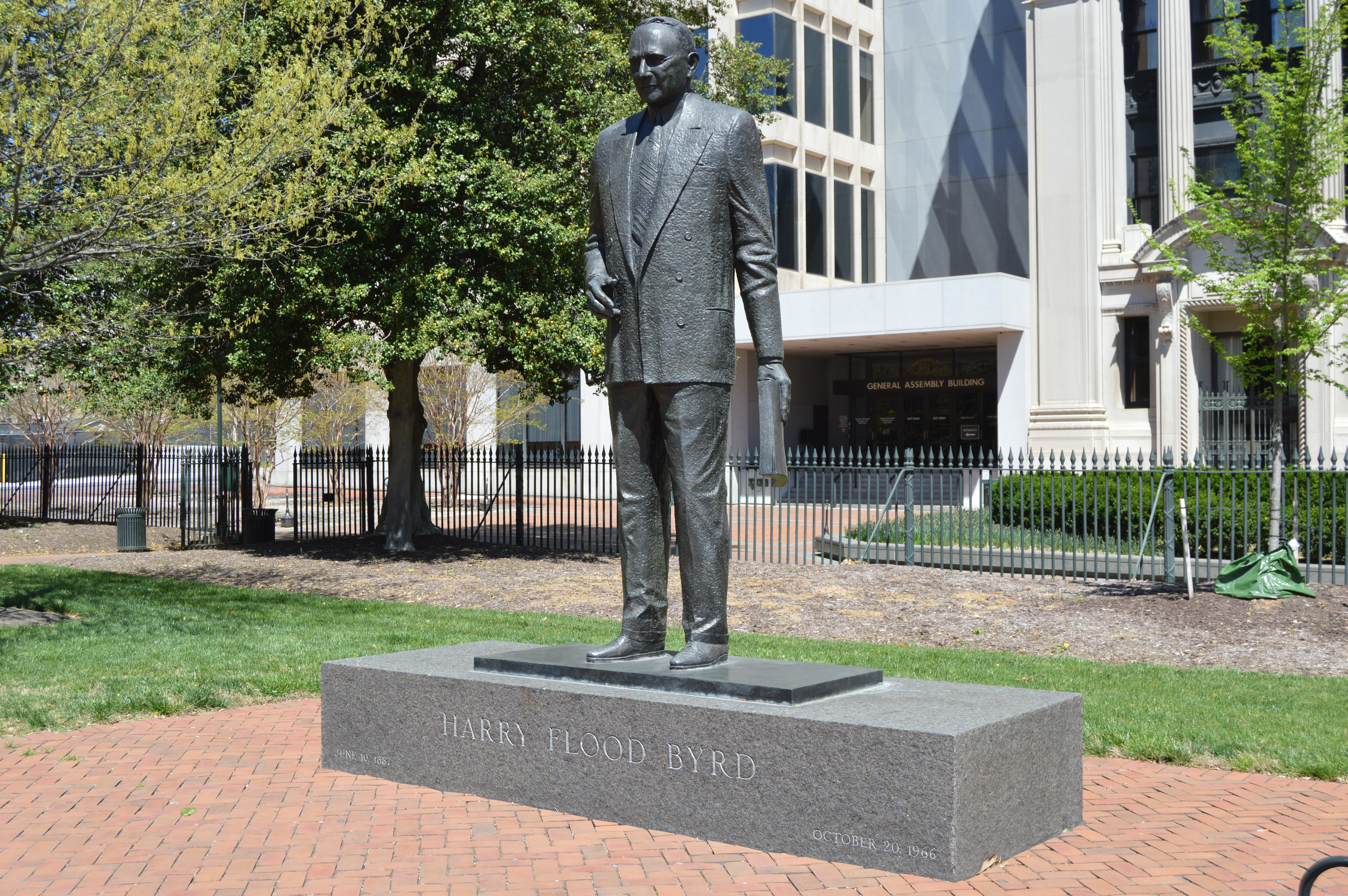
Harry Byrd statue on Richmond's capitol lawn in 2017. The statue was removed in 2021.

Byrd worked in public service for almost fifty years, becoming an influential figure in U.S. politics, and through his Byrd machine, the most powerful force in Virginia politics for much of the 20th century. His leading role in defying the U.S. Supreme Court decision in Brown v. Board of Education (1954) by devising the massive resistance strategy has come to dominate public memory of his career, leading to a mixed legacy.

Dr. Ronald L. Heinemann, Squires Professor of History at Hampden-Sydney College from 1969 to 2007, assessed Byrd's life and career in Harry Byrd of Virginia (published in 1996). Heinemann concluded that although Byrd was a skillful and intelligent politician, one who rose to dominance in Virginia and U.S. politics for decades, he frequently overlooked many other issues he could have helped address in favor of defending white supremacist policies and resisting the changing of the times, consequently squandering his long-term reputation on a doomed battle to preserve de jure racial segregation in the U.S.

A New York Times editorial following Byrd's retirement from the U.S. Senate in 1965 gave a similar assessment: "A talented man, Byrd chose to stand outside the broad currents of his time and to set his face against the future... He began as a force and ended as an anachronism."

Possibly Byrd's greatest and most enduring achievement in public life was his strong advocacy for the creation of Shenandoah National Park, as well as the Skyline Drive, the Blue Ridge Parkway, and the Virginia state park system. Byrd's influence kept Shenandoah National Park segregated during its construction by the CCC, at its initial establishment, and even a year after the Truman Administration mandated full desegregation in all national parks. Shenandoah National Park's main visitor center is named in his honor.

The Blue Ridge Parkway bridge over the James River in Big Island, Virginia was named and dedicated to him in 1985.

On November 26, 1968, the Virginia State Highway Commission named Virginia State Route 7, a historic road which travels from Alexandria past Berryville to Winchester, as "Harry Flood Byrd Highway" between Alexandria and Winchester. In 2021, the Loudoun County Board of Supervisors voted to rename Route 7 within the unincorporated areas of Loudoun County, "Leesburg Pike". Byrd's home from 1926 until his death, Rosemont Manor, still exists and is surrounded by about 60 acres. Although many acres of Byrd's former orchards are now commercial and residential properties, Rosemont is now open to the public as a bed and breakfast, as well as event venue.

A statue of Byrd was installed in Richmond's Capitol Square in 1976. The statue became controversial after Virginia began to reconsider its historical monuments, and the Byrd statue was subsequently removed in 2021.

In 2016, forty-five years after its 1971 founding, Harry F. Byrd Middle School, a National Blue Ribbon School in a suburb of Richmond, Virginia, was renamed to Quioccasin Middle School. In response to a campaign in the local community, the Henrico County School Board agreed that "having a school named after a man who supported school segregation was inappropriate." "Quioccasin" is both the name of the road on which the school is located as well as the name of a black village that had once been located in the immediate vicinity.

Party political offices
Preceded by Elbert Lee Trinkle	Democratic nominee for Governor of Virginia; 1925	Succeeded by John Garland Pollard
Preceded by Claude A. Swanson	Democratic nominee for U.S. Senator from Virginia (Class 1); 1933, 1934, 1940, 1946, 1952, 1958, 1964	Succeeded by Harry F. Byrd Jr.
Political offices
Preceded by Elbert L. Trinkle	Governor of Virginia; February 1, 1926 – January 15, 1930	Succeeded by John G. Pollard
Preceded by Eugene D. Millikin	Chairman of the Senate Finance Committee; 1955–1965	Succeeded by Russell B. Long
U.S. Senate
Preceded by Claude A. Swanson	U.S. senator (Class 1) from Virginia; March 4, 1933 – November 10, 1965; Served alongside: E. Carter Glass, Thomas G. Burch, A. Willis Robertson	Succeeded by Harry F. Byrd Jr.
