= Michael L. Taylor =

Ex U.S. Special Forces member and owner of a private security company

- Born: Staten Island, NY
- Military career
- Branch: U.S. Army Special Forces
- Units: 10th Special Forces; 11th Special Forces

Michael L. Taylor, also known as Mike Taylor, is a United States Army Special Forces (Green Beret) military veteran who served in the U.S. who ran an independent security company. He is most notable for his work rescuing abducted children and providing risk assessment to large public and private organizations. Taylor was responsible for planning and executing the mission to extract Nissan/Renault executive Carlos Ghosn from Japan and later served more than two years in prison for his involvement with Ghosn.

== Early life and education ==
Taylor was born in Staten Island, New York. His stepfather was in the U.S. Army and his family eventually settled in Ayer, Massachusetts where his father was stationed at Fort Devens Military Base. Taylor attended Ayer High School where he was co-captain of the football team and voted “Most Likely to Succeed.”

== Military career ==
Following high school Taylor chose to enlist in the military, rather than pursue a college degree. He participated in an experimental program which allowed new recruits to bypass certain criteria in order to be selected for the U.S. Special Forces. After completing his training at the John F. Kennedy U.S. Institute of Military Assistance, Special Forces School, he was stationed at Fort Devens, in Massachusetts and admitted to the elite 10th Special Forces, or Green Beret, unit. Taylor also served in the 11th Special Forces unit.

As a Special Forces soldier, Taylor and other operatives were trained in HALO operations (High Altitude Low Opening) carrying Special Atomic Demolition Munition (SADM) devices. Their mission was to deploy their parachutes at low altitudes and detonate the devices in the event of a Soviet invasion of Europe.

In the early 1980s, Taylor was sent to Lebanon to train the Lebanese Army following the assassination Bachir Gemayel. He served on one of the first US Mobile Training Teams (MTT) to be deployed in Lebanon. Taylor was on the way to the US Embassy in Beirut when a bomb blew up the building in April 1983. He pulled survivors from the destroyed building.

He left the active army in 1983 and returned to Lebanon to work as a private security contractor, helping to train military forces.

== Private security work ==
Following his time in the military, Taylor returned to the United States and moved to Harvard, Massachusetts. From 1988 to 1991, he used his experience in the military as an undercover source requested by the Federal Bureau of Investigation (FBI), U.S. Customs, ATF, and Department of Treasury to break up an international drug and money laundering organization. The operation resulted in the seizure of three tons of hashish with a street value in excess of $100 million destined for Boston. One person later described Taylor as “the key player and critical link in one of the most important Federal Law enforcement operations in history.”

In 1993, Taylor established a private security corporation that provided risk mitigation services for corporations, government agencies, and high-profile individuals. One of the firm's early assignments was to conduct a vulnerability assessment for the Port Authority of New York and New Jersey following the 1993 bombing of the World Trade Center. In 1994 the firm changed its name to American International Security Corporation.

The business was initially focused on protection services but gained work through referrals from the State Department and FBI. The work expanded to include assisting parents whose children had been abducted and taken overseas by former spouses.

Between 1991 and 1999, Taylor and his company provided services to approximately 12 families in the United States whose children were abducted by family members and taken illegally to foreign territories.

Clients of American International Security included ABC, 20th Century Fox, Signature Flight Support, Delta Air Lines, Disney, and several Fortune 50 corporations. The company has provided personal protection to individuals, employing former military personnel.

Following the 2003 US-led invasion of Iraq, American International Security Corp employed nearly 2,000 people, many of whom were former members of Special Forces or the intelligence community. During the war, Taylor spent long periods of time in both Iraq and Afghanistan working for the U.S. government helping ensure the safe delivery of supplies.

During a 2005 labor dispute between Northwest Airlines and their mechanic's union, American International Security was hired to provide security for senior executives of the airline. After Northwest declared bankruptcy later that same year, American International Security claimed it was owed roughly $1.3 million by Northwest.

In 2007, American International Security secured a Pentagon contract to train Afghan special-forces troops at a fee totaling $54 million.

In December 2008, Taylor led the team that included Duane “Dewey” Clarridge to assist in seeking the release of New York Times reporter, David Rohde, who had been kidnapped by the Taliban in Afghanistan. Seven months later, in June 2009, Rohde managed to escape on his own.

American International Security Corporation's work included collecting intelligence on activity in Pakistan and Afghanistan to share with military officials about possible threats to American forces. The firm was part of a small network of private companies formed in 2009 by the U.S. Defense Department to track suspected militants and the location of insurgent camps.

American International Security was dissolved in 2014.

== Involvement with Carlos Ghosn ==
In December 2019, news broke that former Nissan executive Carlos Ghosn, who was on bail in Japan, had fled to Lebanon with the assistance of an American former Special Operations soldier and his son.

An Interpol Red Notice was issued in early 2020 for Taylor and his son Peter for their alleged involvement in smuggling Ghosn out of Japan. In May 2020, the two were arrested at their home in Harvard, Massachusetts and held at the Norfolk County Correctional Facility to await extradition to Japan.

The Taylor family set up a Change.org petition to raise public awareness of his efforts to fight extradition.

Despite efforts by their lawyers, the Taylors were denied bail in July 2020 and continued to be detained in Massachusetts because prosecutors argued that the two represented a flight risk. In court, U.S. prosecutors said Ghosn had wired more than $860,000 to a company linked to Peter Taylor shortly before the escape and that Ghosn's son later made $500,000 in cryptocurrency payments to the Taylors. Japanese prosecutors claimed that roughly $400,000 of the initial $860,000 was spent on a private jet.

Following their arrest, Taylor and his son fought extradition for ten months (see: Taylor v. McDermott) arguing that at the time of the escape there was no law in Japan against assisting in a “bail jump” and that the Japanese prison conditions are inhumane. In 2023, the Japanese parliament revised the country's laws on bail jumping in response to the escape of Ghosn.

In October 2020, the U.S. Department of State agreed to turn the two men over to Japan, but a court judge put the extradition on hold after Taylor's lawyers filed an emergency petition. The judge later rejected the petition and Taylor's lawyers appealed to the federal appeals court.

That same month, Taylor's attorney was assured by U.S. prosecutors that the government would not seek to surrender the Taylors to Japan before February 12, 2021.

The Taylors aggressively lobbied the Trump Administration, hiring attorneys Abbe Lowell, who had represented Donald Trump's son-in-law, Jared Kushner, and Ty Cobb, a former Trump White House General Counsel.

Despite their efforts, the Taylors were extradited to Japan in March 2021 and held in detention in Japan. The two appeared before a Japanese court in June and apologized for providing aid to Ghosn. Michael Taylor received a sentence of two years while Peter Taylor was ordered to serve 20 months in prison.

Neither of the Taylors were given credit in Japan for the ten months they were held in the United States awaiting extradition.

Michael Taylor was imprisoned at the Fuchu Detention Center. He was held in an unheated cell with only a thin mat providing protection from the concrete floor. Taylor developed frostbite while working in a prison factory where inmates are prohibited from wearing gloves and required to wash their hands multiple times a day in cold water.

During his imprisonment, Taylor spent 17 months in solitary confinement. He was required to tear paper into small pieces as a form of psychological torture.

In October 2022, after serving 20 months in a Japanese prison, Taylor and his son were returned to the United States.

As of July 2023, Taylor had not been reimbursed in full by Ghosn for $1 million in legal fees incurred by Taylor following his arrest.

== Film and television ==
Taylor sold the rights to his life story to MGM/UA TV in 2022. The studio has announced plans for a feature-length film starring actor Sam Rockwell who will serve as executive producer of the TV series, along with Mark Berger. The series will focus on Taylor's early life as Special Forces soldier and his years as a private security consultant.

Taylor appears in the 2023 AppleTV+ documentary Wanted: The Escape of Carlos Ghosn.

== Vitamin1 ==
Taylor launched a bottled healthy hydration drink called VITAMIN 1. The beverage was the official sports drink of the American football camp run by Rob Gronkowski, formerly of the New England Patriots.

== Personal life ==
Taylor speaks Norwegian and Arabic. In 1985, he married Lamia Abboud, a Lebanese national. Together the couple have three children, two of whom attended college in Lebanon. Taylor and his wife own a home in Beirut.

Taylor lives in Harvard, Massachusetts. He was the football coach at Lawrence Academy, a private school in Groton, MA from 2007 to 2011. All three of his sons played for the team and Taylor was among the largest individual donors to the school at the time. Taylor donated the necessary funds to pay for a new football field at the school. Under Taylor's leadership, the school won two ISL football titles and a NEPSAC Bowl, with a record of 17–1. A number of Taylor's players went on to sign with NCAA Division I schools. In 2011, the Independent School League imposed sanctions against Lawrence Academy's football program, which included stripping the school of their 2009 and 2010 league titles obtained when Taylor served as head coach.
