= New Boston Space Force Station =

United States Space Force facility in Hillsborough County, south central New Hampshire

- Near New Boston, New Hampshire in United States
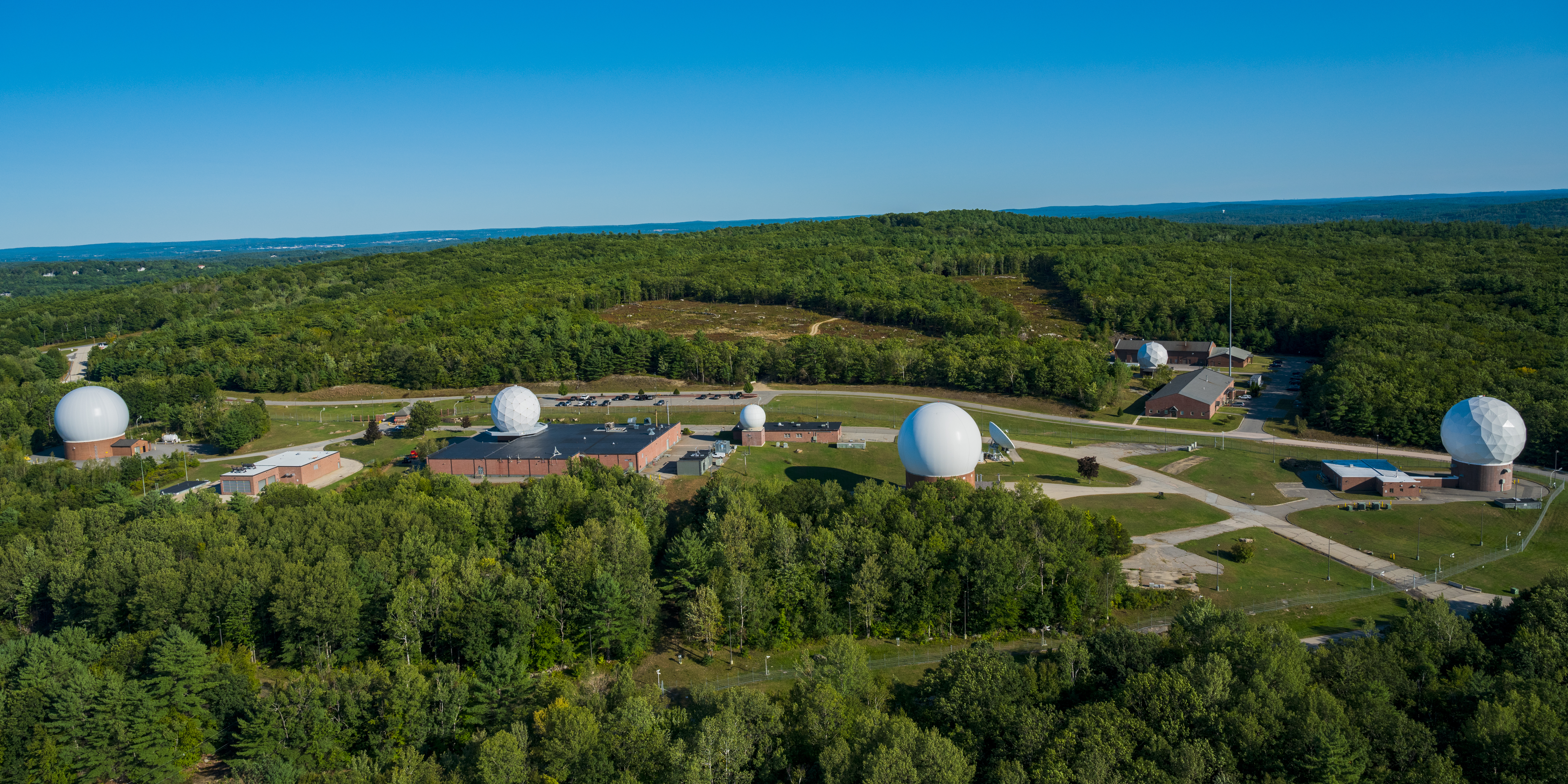
- New Boston Space Force Station in 2022

- Emblem of the Space Base Delta 1

Site information
- Type: US Space Force station
- Owner: Department of Defense
- Operator: United States Space Force
- Controlled by: Space Base Delta 1
- Open to the public: Partially
- Condition: Operational

Location
- Location in the United States New Boston SFS (New Hampshire)
- Coordinates: 42.942350°N 71.636095°W

Site history
- Built: 1959 – 1960
- In use: 1960 – 2019 (US Air Force); 2019 – present (US Space Force)

Garrison information
- Current commander: Lt. Col. David Zesinger
- Garrison: Space Base Delta 1
- Occupants: 23rd Space Operations Squadron

New Boston Space Force Station (BOSS) is a United States Space Force facility located in Hillsborough County in south central New Hampshire. It was transferred from the United States Air Force to the Space Force in the summer of 2020.

The installation occupies more than 2,800 acres (11 km^{2}) in three towns: New Boston, Amherst, and Mont Vernon. It was originally established in 1942 as a practice area for bombers and fighter planes from nearby Grenier Army Air Field (now Manchester–Boston Regional Airport). Starting in 1959, it was turned into a satellite-tracking station, providing the facility's most prominent feature, the weatherproof radomes which dot the hillside. BOSS has been providing support for northernly launches from KSC/Cape Canaveral for decades, and has supported the Space Shuttle and Titan IV heavy-lift programs. Since 2020 the facility has also provided line of sight telemetry tracking for commercial space launches by SpaceX.

New Boston SFS is operated by the 23rd Space Operations Squadron (23 SOPS), a geographically separated unit (GSU) of Space Delta 6, part of Space Base Delta 1 at Schriever Space Force Base, Colorado.

The 23rd SOPS operates and maintains the largest Satellite Control Network remote tracking station at New Boston SFS, as well as at three other GSU's located at Thule Air Base, Greenland, RAF Oakhanger, United Kingdom, and the Eastern Vehicle Checkout Facility located at Cape Canaveral, Florida. The squadron provides real-time capability to users performing on-orbit tracking, telemetry, commanding and mission data retrieval services.

Additionally, the squadron provides remote command and control capability through two Global Positioning System Control stations located at Cape Canaveral and Ascension Island in the South Atlantic Ocean. The squadron also operates and maintains a Defense Satellite Communications System Heavy Earth Terminal, and additional equipment in support of the National Oceanographic Atmospheric Administration and other mission partners.

The installation and infrastructure are said to be worth more than $106 million.

== History ==
The New Boston Space Force Station dates back to 1942, when what was then Grenier Field in Manchester was preparing to meet the demands of World War II.

On September 5, 1941, Colonel John Moore, commanding officer of the U.S. Army Air Corps at Grenier Field, wrote a letter proposing the government create a bombing range in New Boston near Joe English Pond. "The nature of the terrain around the pond is such that aerial bombing thereon would offer the elements of surprise, concealed approach and navigation to a point," Moore wrote. "It is believed that Joe English Hill (altitude 1,245 feet) would be a satisfactory stop for any ricochet bullets from ground machine gun targets."

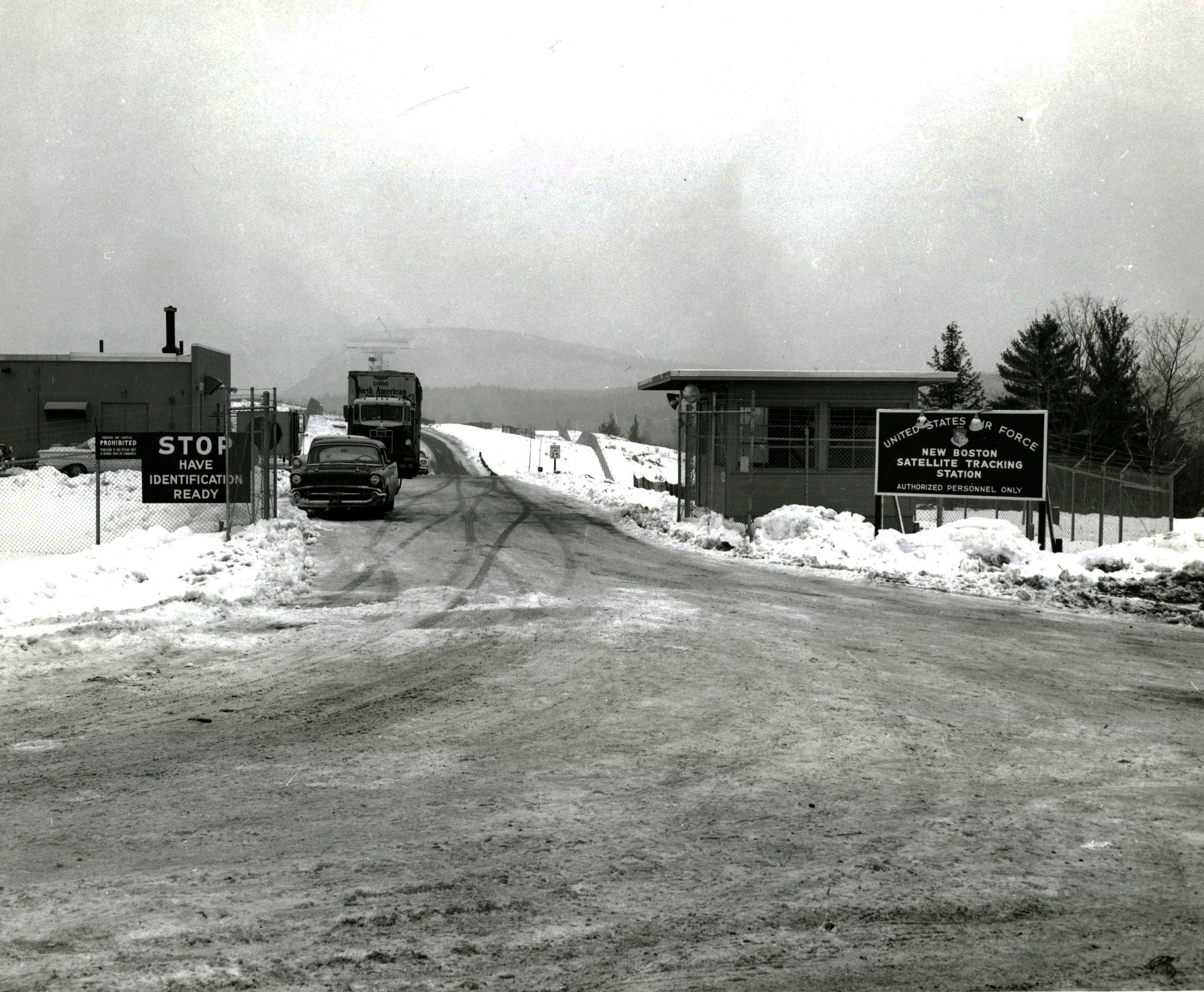
The main gate at New Boston AFS in 1960

Eventually, land belonging to 16 families, 12 of them in New Boston, was taken at a cost of $23,200.

There was no electricity on site, and water had to be brought from Dodge's store in the center of New Boston. Nail kegs were used as chairs. Locals felt so sorry for the soldiers that they donated used furniture.

During World War II, local residents remember watching fighters and bombers train at the Air Force station and learned to recognize the sounds of strafing and bombing as they went about their tasks. "I'd watch from the kitchen window," 89-year-old Evelyn Barss told the Nashua Telegraph newspaper in a 2005 story. "They would come in across the hill and drop their bombs and we would see them. These little black specks would go down, and you would hear a small discharge - they didn't use a lot of powder because it was scarce during the war."

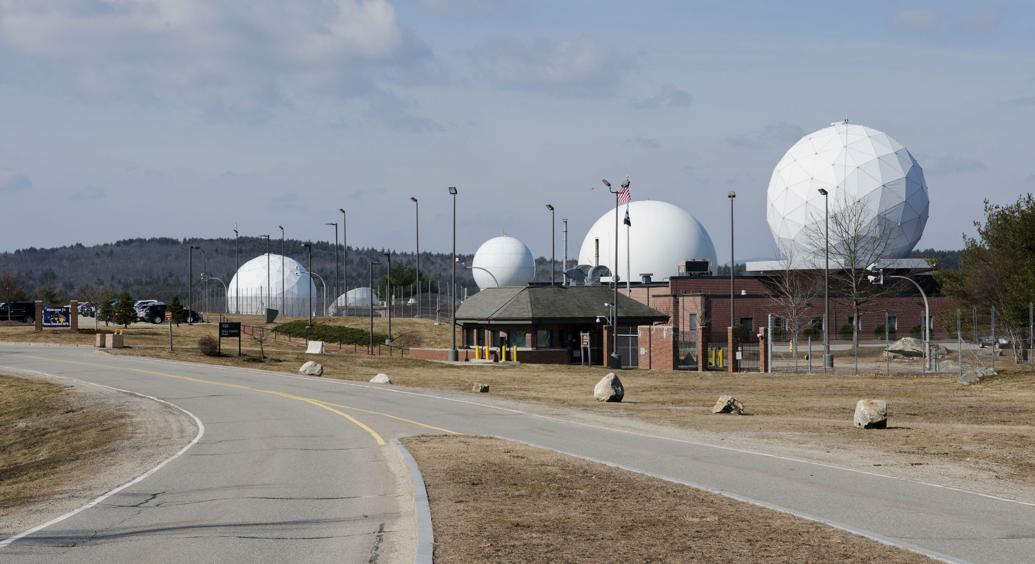
Multiple radomes visible from New Boston SFS from the front gate

Roland Goodwin worked at the base on and off for three decades and remembers seeing the tail fins of bombs sticking out of the pond. Planes at one time practiced dropping depth bombs for sinking submarines. "Every building we built down there in the early days ... we usually ran into a buried bomb of some kind. We'd have to bring people up from Fort Devens to detonate it." Ordnance has been detonated as late as 2010.

After the war, the station took a lower profile. The bombing range was deactivated and after a long debate about the site's future, it became home to new satellite tracking antennas.

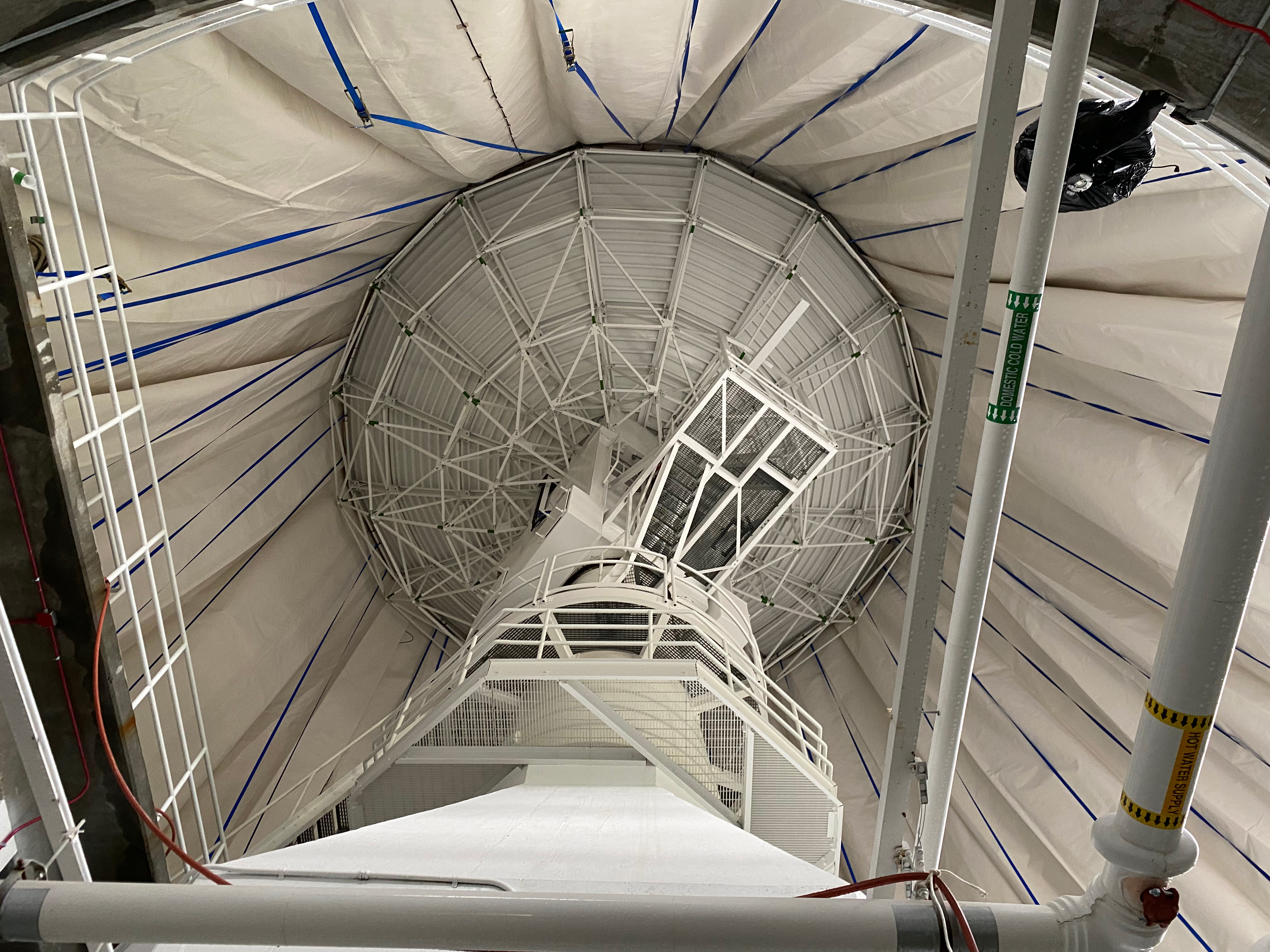
Inside a New Boston radome in 2021

Satellite support operations at New Boston Satellite Tracking Station began April 1, 1960, using van-mounted equipment. Simultaneous with van operations, the installation of equipment in permanent facilities began under the Weapons Systems 117L program. Van operations were gradually phased out, and by June 1964, the entire station was operating in permanent facilities. By the summer of 1964, the station had dual satellite tracking, telemetry and commanding capabilities. (During the late 1970s and early 1980s it was known as Detachment 1 of the 2014th Communications Squadron located at Hanscom Air Force Base in Bedford, Massachusetts Not true, see the following) It first was the 6594th Instrumentation Squadron in 1959 and then Detachment 2 of the AFSCF in 1979 until 1987. The squadron was transferred to Air Force Space Command, and the station moved from a research and development environment into the operational Air Force Oct. 1, 1987. The 23rd Space Operations Squadron was realigned under the 50th NOG March 10, 2004, and the station celebrated its 50th anniversary. Assigned to the 50th NOG, the unit later gained responsibility and oversight of the 23rd SOPS began supporting three other AFSCN sites including 23rd SOPS Detachment 1, located at Thule Air Base, Greenland, and RAF Oakhanger, United Kingdom, Oct. 1, 2010. The third site, the Eastern Vehicle Checkout Facility is located at Cape Canaveral and ensures operation of satellites prior to and during initial launch. The 23rd SOPS began supporting two GPS ground antennas and monitor stations Aug. 1, 2011. One is located at Cape Canaveral and the other is located at Ascension Auxiliary Air Field on RAF Ascension Island.

=== Space Force ===
In July 2021 the facility was renamed from New Boston Air Force Station to New Boston Space Force Station.

On July 19, the facility was upgraded, with a new hybrid automated remote tracking system for the facility's 13 meter antenna, and a new radome installed over the antenna.

== Based units ==
Notable units based at New Boston Space Force Station.

=== United States Space Force ===
Space Force Combat Forces Command (CFC)

- Space Delta 6
  - 23rd Space Operations Squadron

23 SOPS is a Geographically Separate Unit, which although based at New Boston SFS, is subordinate to the Space Delta 6 based at Schriever AFB in Colorado.

== Geography ==
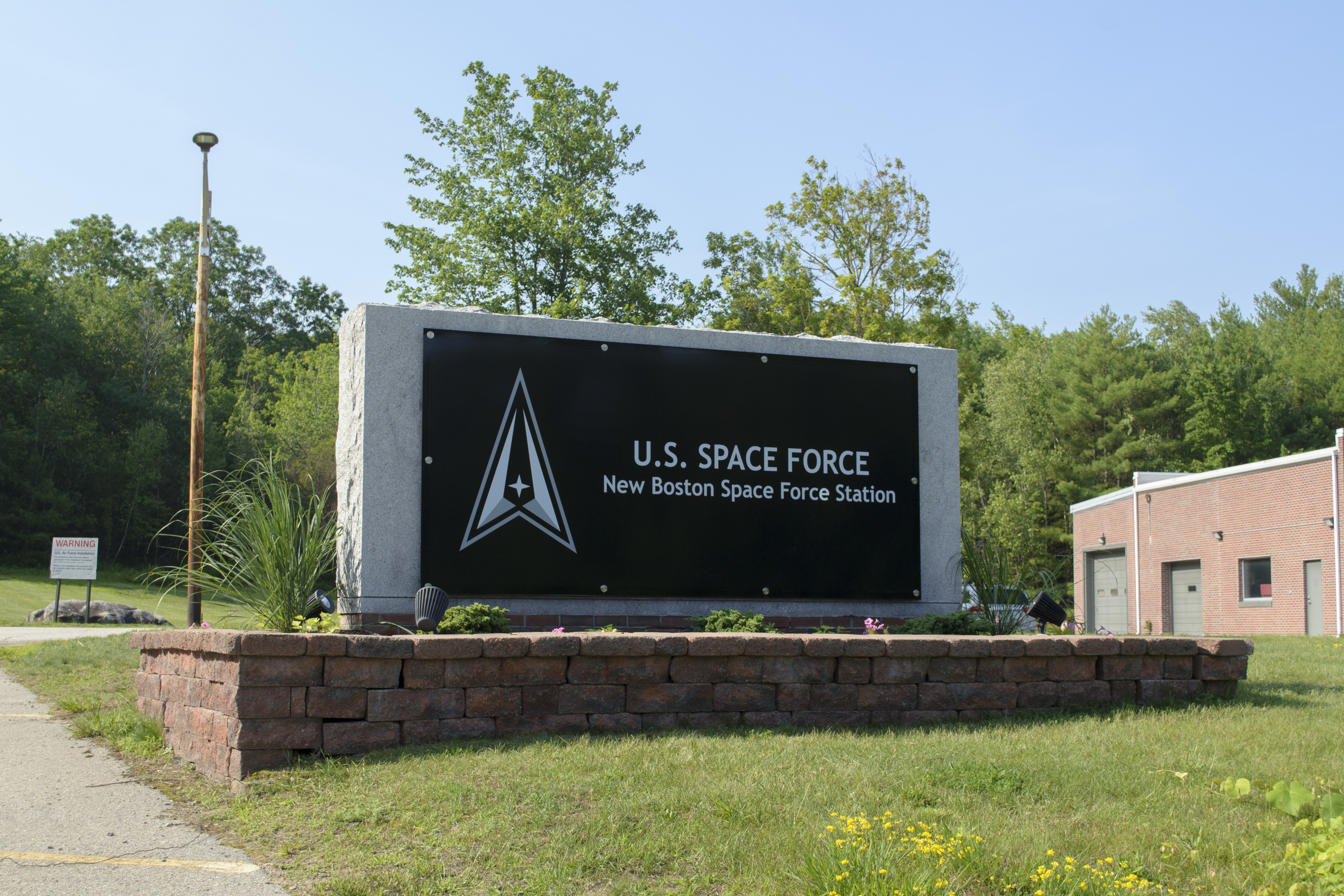
The new installation sign after its July 2021 redesignation ceremony

A few working farms are in the vicinity; however, most of the surrounding area is heavily wooded with pockets of residential development. Commercial development consists primarily of small shopping centers with a few office complexes along NH State Route 101 to the southeast.

New Boston SFS consists mostly of undeveloped, forested land with extensive wetlands. Local, state, and federal laws governing the preservation of natural, cultural, and environmental resources play a major role in limiting development on and around the station.

The station lies within the Merrimack River watershed. Fourteen freshwater ponds fed by springs or streams, which occupy approximately 100 acres (405,000 m^{2}), and seven miles (11 km) of streams exist on the station. The ponds are bordered by wetlands, and the streams by riparian vegetation. Riffle and pool habitats are favorable for many cold water fish species. Wetland types include freshwater emergent marshes of variable depths, wet meadows, shrub and deciduous wooded swamps such as red maple and black gum swamps, and a red spruce bog. This bog contains a deep peat layer.

Of all the water bodies on the station, only Joe English Pond appears on the list of protected water bodies under the New Hampshire Department of Environmental Services Comprehensive Shoreline Protection Act (CSPA).
