= Homeless veterans in the United States =

Homeless veterans are persons who have served in the armed forces who are homeless, including those who lack a fixed, regular and adequate nighttime residence or live in emergency shelters, transitional housing or places not intended for human habitation.

Federal homelessness data distinguish between sheltered veterans living in emergency shelters, transitional housing or other temporary settings and unsheltered veterans living in vehicles, parks, abandoned buildings or other places not intended for human habitation.

The United States Department of Housing and Urban Development counted 32,495 veterans experiencing homelessness on a single night in January 2025, a 56.1% decrease from 2010.

== Background ==
Veterans experiencing homelessness may have post-traumatic stress disorder, an anxiety disorder that can develop after exposure to trauma, but veteran homelessness usually results from overlapping health, economic, social and housing-related factors rather than a single cause.

Factors associated with veteran homelessness include:

- Disabilities, including physical injuries and mental health conditions
- Substance use disorders, including drug and alcohol use disorders
- Family breakdown and lack of social support
- Joblessness, unstable income and poverty
- Lack of low-cost and affordable housing
- Government policy and gaps in access to housing and support services
- A history of incarceration
- Adverse childhood experiences
- Military sexual trauma
- A less-than-honorable military discharge or little or no service-connected disability compensation

Housing availability also affects the prevalence of veteran homelessness. The Department of Veterans Affairs has reported that communities with higher rental costs tend to have greater levels of veteran homelessness and that an adequate supply of affordable and permanent supportive housing is necessary to prevent and end homelessness.

Mental health conditions and substance use disorders can increase vulnerability to homelessness, but most Americans with those conditions do not experience homelessness, and many people experiencing homelessness have neither a severe mental health condition nor a substance use disorder.

== Demographics ==
Veteran homelessness in America is not a phenomenon only of the 21st century; as early as the Reconstruction Era, homeless veterans were among the general homeless population. In 1932, homeless veterans were part of the Bonus Army. In 1934, there were as many as a quarter million veterans living on the streets. During the Truman Administration, there were one hundred thousand homeless veterans in Chicago, and a quarter of that number in Washington, D.C. In 1987, the number of homeless veterans was as high as three hundred thousand. As of 2024, 0.22% of all veterans were homeless.

Estimates of the homeless population vary as these statistics are very difficult to obtain. In 2007, the first veterans of Operation Enduring Freedom - Afghanistan and Operation Iraqi Freedom began to be documented in homeless shelters. By 2009 there were 154,000 homeless, with slightly less than half having served in South Vietnam. According to the VA in 2011, veterans made up 14% of homeless adult males, and 2% of homeless adult females, and both groups were overrepresented within the homeless population compared to the general population. The overall count in 2012 showed 62,619 homeless veterans in the United States. In January 2013, there were an estimated 57,849 homeless veterans in the U.S., or 12% of the homeless population. Just under 8% were female. In July 2014, the largest population of homeless veterans lived in Los Angeles County, with there being over 6,000 homeless veterans, out of the total estimated 54,000 homeless within that area. In 2015, a report issued by HUD counted over 47,000 homeless veterans nationwide, the majority of whom were White and male. In 2016, there were over 39,000 homeless veterans nationwide. A Corps in terms of military size. As of January 2017, the state of California had the highest number of veterans experiencing homelessness. There were an estimated 11,472 homeless veterans.

In 2025, there were an estimated 32,495 homeless veterans. Veterans make up 5.3% of all homeless individuals in the United States. Almost nineteen thousand homeless veterans are in temporary housing or emergency shelters. Half of homeless veterans were White, about a fifth were Black, six percent were Indigenous, about two percent were Asian, about one percent were Native Hawaiian or Pacific Islander, less than half a percent were MENA, and almost twelve percent were Hispanic or Latino. The states with the largest homeless veteran populations were California (8,686), Florida (2,141), Texas (1,907), Washington (1,757), and Oregon (1,635). The states with the highest percentage of unsheltered homeless veterans were California, Washington, New Mexico, Mississippi, and Georgia.

== Aid ==
Many programs and resources have been implemented across the United States in an effort to help homeless veterans.

HUD-VASH, a housing voucher program by the United States Department of Housing and Urban Development and Veterans Administration, gives out a certain number of Section 8 subsidized housing vouchers to eligible homeless and otherwise vulnerable U.S. Armed Forces veterans.

=== Historical ===
In 1887, the Sawtelle Veterans Home was constructed to care for disabled veterans, and housed more than a thousand homeless veterans. Other such old soldiers' homes were built throughout the United States, such as the one in New York. These homes became the predecessors of the Veteran Affairs' medical facilities.

=== Risk factors ===
According to a study in 2014, veterans are slightly more likely than non-veterans to be homeless; 9.7% of the general population are veterans, but 12.3% of the homeless population are veterans. These risk factors were found by using the Preferred Reporting Items for Systematic Reviews and Meta-Analyses (PRISMA). This is the first systemic review to summarize research on risk factors for US veterans experiencing homelessness. They evaluated thirty-one studies from 1987 through 2014. The risk factors that are most common among this population are substance abuse disorders and poor mental health, followed by low income and other income related issues, a lack of support from family and friends, or weak social networks.

=== Supportive housing for veterans compared to non-veterans ===
The needs between veterans and non-veterans experiencing homelessness can differ. A study was implemented by the Collaborative Initiative to Help End Chronic Homelessness (CICH) in 2004 by the Interagency Council on Homelessness. They used eleven sites around the United States tracked data for one year by comparing 162 chronically homeless veterans to 388 chronically homeless non-veterans.

Both groups were enrolled in a national supported housing initiative over a one-year period and several differences were noted. The first was that the veterans tended to be from an older age group, identified as male, and were more likely to have completed high school. While in enrolled in supported housing, the mental health of both groups improved through mental health services offered. However, veterans were reported to make greater use of the outpatient mental health services compared to non-veterans. Both groups also gradually reduced the use of health services once housing was obtained, therefore, this suggests that the program is effective in reducing clinical needs among chronically homeless of adults in general.

=== Department of Veterans Affairs ===
On November 3, 2009, United States Secretary Eric K. Shinseki spoke at the National Summit on Homeless Veterans and announced his plan.

Along with President Barack Obama, Shinseki outlined a comprehensive five-year plan to strengthen the Department of Veterans Affairs and its efforts to end veteran homeless. The goal was to end veteran homelessness by 2015, but because of budget constraints that has now been pushed to 2017. The plan focused on prevention of homelessness along with help for those living on the streets. The plan would expand mental health care and housing options for veterans, and would collaborate with:

- The Departments of Education, Labor, Health and Human Services, and Housing and Urban Development
- Small Business Administration
- U.S. Interagency Council on Homelessness
- State directors of veterans affairs
- Veteran service organizations
- National, state, and local social service providers and community groups

The prominent role of the Department of Veterans Affairs and its joined up approach to veteran welfare help to distinguish the US response to veteran homelessness internationally. In 2009, a hotline was established to assist homeless veterans. As of December 2014, of the 79,500 veterans who contacted the call center, 27% were unable to speak to a counselor, and 47% of referrals led to no support services provided to the homeless veteran.

A study published in the American Journal of Addiction showed a link between veterans' trauma of mental disorders and their substance abuse.

=== Housing interventions with veterans ===
A study conducted by O’Connell, Kasprow and Rosenheck is a secondary analysis of data from the evaluation of the HUD-VASH initiative that began in 1992 to provide housing for veterans with psychiatric disorders. They compared the results of three kinds of interventions with 460 veterans across nineteen sites in the country. They were assigned to three groups; one group was given a voucher and intensive case management, one group was given intensive case management only, and one group was given standard care only. Intensive case management included help locating an apartment, while standard care which consisted of short-term broker case management provided by the Health Care for Homeless Veterans outreach workers. An evaluation assistant conducted follow up interviews every three months for up to five years. Through that they found that individuals in the intensive case management group had lower scores on quality of life which was measured by the Lehman Quality of Life Interview. This is a structured questionnaire to assess the life circumstances of persons with severe and persistent mental illness.

Housing failure is defined as experiencing homelessness for at least one day. Before intake, 43% (n=170) has been homeless between one and six months and 27% (n=105) has experienced homelessness for two years or more. The risk factors are the greatest in the first few months of being housed due to the more structured and supervised setting. Weekly face to face contact, community-based care and services offered by the VA were encouraged, which is vastly different from the life they were used to before this program. The veterans were tracked for five years and the statistics changed vastly over that time. 72% of participants remained housed after one year (N=282), 60% after two (N=235), 52% after three (N=204), 47% after four years (N=184) and 36% after five years (N=141) (5). Those in the HUD-VASH group has a lower risk of returning to homelessness over the course of five years had an 87% lower risk compared to those in intensive care management only group and 76% compared to those in standard care. The greatest risk factor for returning to homelessness was either due to drugs or due to PTSD. Overall, after five years of follow up, 44% of all participants (N=172) returned to homelessness for at least one day after being successfully placed into housing.

=== Studies of housing first for veterans ===
To end homelessness among veterans, new resources and program expansions were introduced. One of the goals set by the U.S. Department of Housing and Urban Developments Veterans Affairs Supportive Housing (HUD-VASH) is to place veterans experiencing homelessness in permanent housing. A housing first approach has been introduced to help support this initiative. One of the goals of Housing First is the rapid placement of veterans to directly from the streets to a permanent home.

Housing first approach works with the HUD supplying housing assistance through a voucher program while the VA provides case management and supportive services through its healthcare system. By having permanent housing, there is a decrease in the usage of shelters, hospitals and correctional facilities. This program is available in all 50 states, the District of Columbia and Guam.

A study by Montgomery, Hill, Kane and Culhane was a demonstration that was initiated in 2010 and studied the housing methods in the United States for homeless veterans. They evaluated the efficiency of the Housing First (HF) approach compared to a Treatment as Usual (TAU) approach. HF targeted those were experiencing street homelessness while TAU served more women and families. Veterans placed in HF were offered services such as social workers, vocational trainers, a housing specialist and access to a psychiatrist. Most importantly, HF would issue a housing voucher at the time of lease signing for pre-inspected apartments which were maintained by a contractor. Veterans in the TAU approach received the standard VA case management services for HUD-VASH. In TAU, they remained at their current placement, which could sometimes include an emergency shelter, or they were placed in transitional housing or residential treatment programs.

The study found that the HF has the most effective model in accessing permanent housing and has shown efficiency in reducing rates of homelessness with veterans. Compared to TAU, HF was more successful at quickly moving veterans into permanent housing, their moving process took approximately one month while the TAU approach took about six months. The housing retention rate for HF was 98% and 86% for TAU, meaning that those using the HF model were more likely to maintain housing stability.

=== Charity ===
JROTC cadet from Wilson High School assists at a "Stand Down" event.

In addition to government provided aid, private charities provide assistance to homeless veterans as well. These include providing some homeless veterans vehicles to live in, and building permanent housing for others. Advocating for the rights of homeless veterans through policy implementation and recommendations. Throughout the nation, multiple organizations and agencies host "Stand Down" events where homeless veterans are provided items and services; the first of these was held in San Diego, organized by Vietnam veterans, in 1988.

Homes For Heroes is a US for-profit and non-profit company that provides partner-savings to Veterans buying a home, and offers monetary grants to Veterans, and other medical professionals and first-responders buying a home.

Homes For Angels is a Texas program that provides discounted, affordable real estate services to Veterans and other first-responder service professions buying a home.

== Examples by state ==
=== Florida ===
Michael the Black Man runs a charity called the American Gala Awards (AGA) to help homeless veterans in Miami-Dade county.

=== Massachusetts ===
In Massachusetts, Worcester-based Veterans Inc. received $2.5 million in 2024 to upgrade shelter and transitional housing for veterans as part of a broader state campaign to reduce veteran homelessness. The organization has also received federal Homeless Veterans' Reintegration Program funding to support employment services for veterans experiencing or at risk of homelessness.

=== Texas ===
As of 2023 Texas Homeless network (THN) has joined with the Texas Veterans Commission in order to succeed in ways to decrease Veteran households experiencing being homeless. There are many organizations that strive to help this cause such as "The Veteran Homeless Veteran Program." This is based in Dallas, that provides resource clinics to veteran families. Other ways that organizations strive to combat homelessness within veterans is by locating affordable living, maintaining employment, and budget. According to the "SSVF" program these are the steps that they are taking in order to resolve the issue in the state. Among Veteran population in Texas (2023), the increase of the percentage in homelessness was significant compared to the rest of the country.

== Ending veteran homelessness ==
In November 2009, Secretary of Veterans Affairs (VA) Eric K. Shinseki set out the goal of ending veterans experiencing homelessness by 2017. While not all veterans are housed, the current housing initiatives such as the housing first model are ensuring that housing is obtained for a larger portion of veterans experiencing homelessness. In 2019, the HUD-VASH program was able to house more than 11,000 veterans. Overall, since 2008, more than 114,000 veterans experiencing homelessness have been served through the HUD-VASH program. Also, more resources are being implemented to assist with mental health and addiction. As of 2019, more than 78 communities and the entire states of Connecticut, Delaware and Virginia have effectively ended homelessness among veterans.
