= Fort Devens Historic District =

Historic district in Massachusetts, United States

- U.S. National Register of Historic Places
- U.S. Historic district
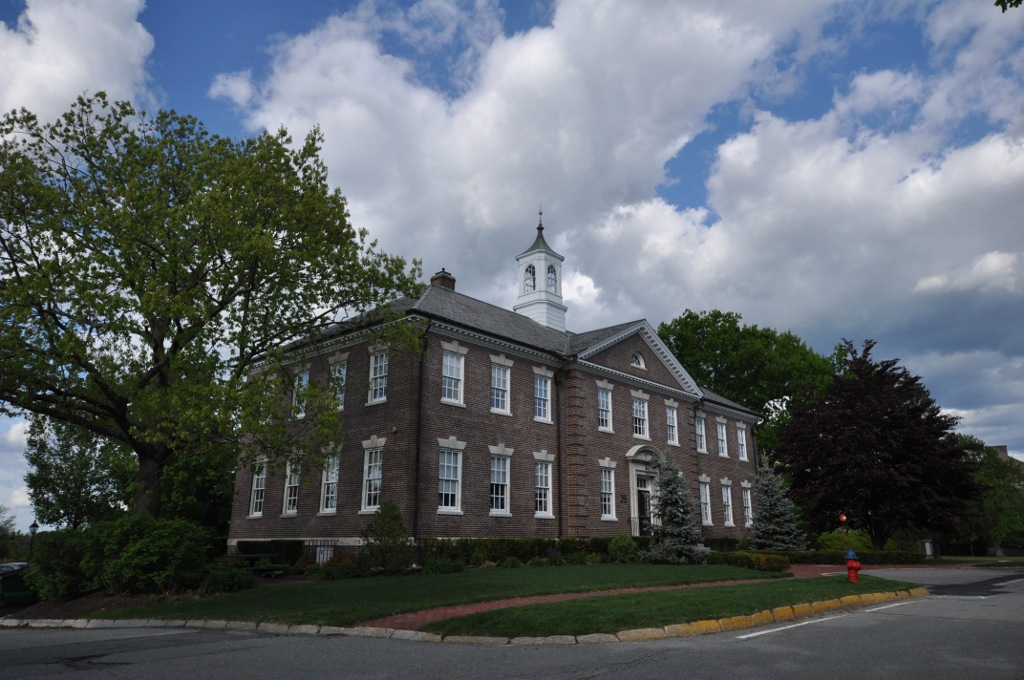
- A larger building on the former military base

- Location within Massachusetts Location within the United States
- Location: Ayer and Harvard, Massachusetts
- Coordinates: 42°32′46″N 71°36′46″W
- Area: 320 acres (130 ha)
- Architect: U.S. Army, Quartermaster Corps; Civilian Conservation Corps (CCC)
- Architectural style: Late 19th And 20th Century Revivals
- NRHP reference No.: 93000437
- Added to NRHP: June 10, 1993

The Fort Devens Historic District is a historic district roughly bounded by El Caney St., Antietam St., Sherman Ave., MacArthur Ave. and Buena Vista Street in Devens, Massachusetts, encompassing territory in both Ayer and Harvard. The district is in a portion of the former Fort Devens and includes a large number of historically and architecturally significant buildings.

The buildings that are deemed of most significant historic importance are those that were built in the period 1929–39. This building phase was begun after the United States Army decided to upgrade temporary facilities dating from World War I, to provide more permanent facilities at the base. This resulted in the construction of a significant number of Georgian Revival buildings in a rough U shape around a central parade ground. These buildings included dormitory facilities for soldiers, administrative office space, and warehouse facilities. This area is also significant as the site from 1933 to 1937 of an encampment of the Civilian Conservation Corps, and for its association with Congresswoman Edith Nourse Rogers, without whose efforts the base might have been closed instead of being upgraded.

The district was added to the National Register of Historic Places in 1993. Its main boundaries on the north, west, and south, are Antietam and El Caney Streets. The eastern boundary is mainly Jackson Street, although there is an extension further eastward to Auman Avenue, where there are rows of single-family housing. One of the most visually dominant elements of the district are Rogers Field, the former parade ground, and the grouping of former barracks buildings on its north side.

== See also ==
- National Register of Historic Places listings in Worcester County, Massachusetts
- National Register of Historic Places listings in Middlesex County, Massachusetts
