= 1st Range Operations Squadron =

U.S. Space Force unit

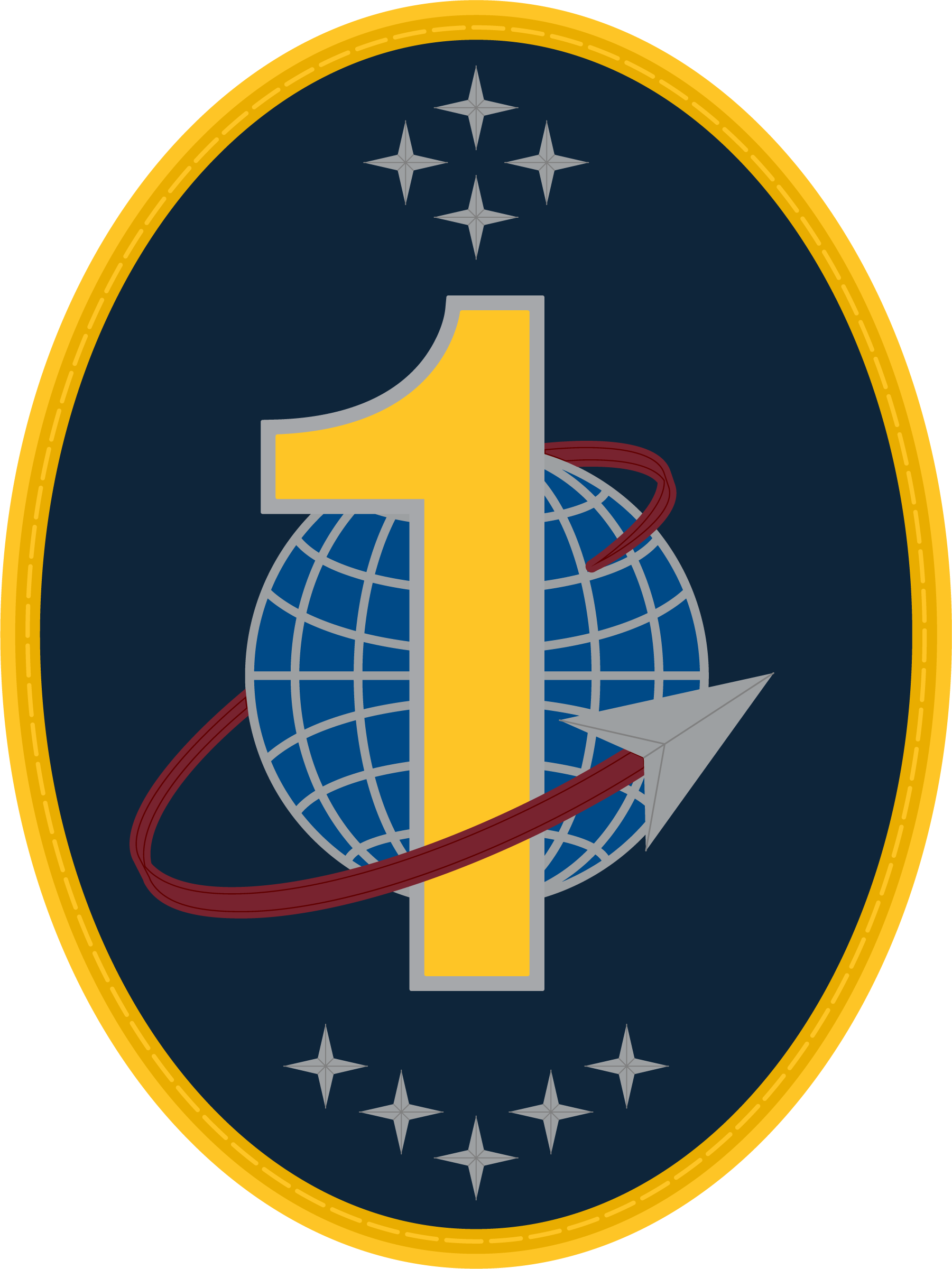
- 1 ROPS emblem
- Active: 1 December 2003–present
- Country: United States
- Branch: United States Space Force
- Type: Squadron
- Role: Space launch
- Part of: Space Launch Delta 45
- Headquarters: Patrick Space Force Base, Florida, U.S.

Commanders
- Notable commanders: James E. Smith

Insignia
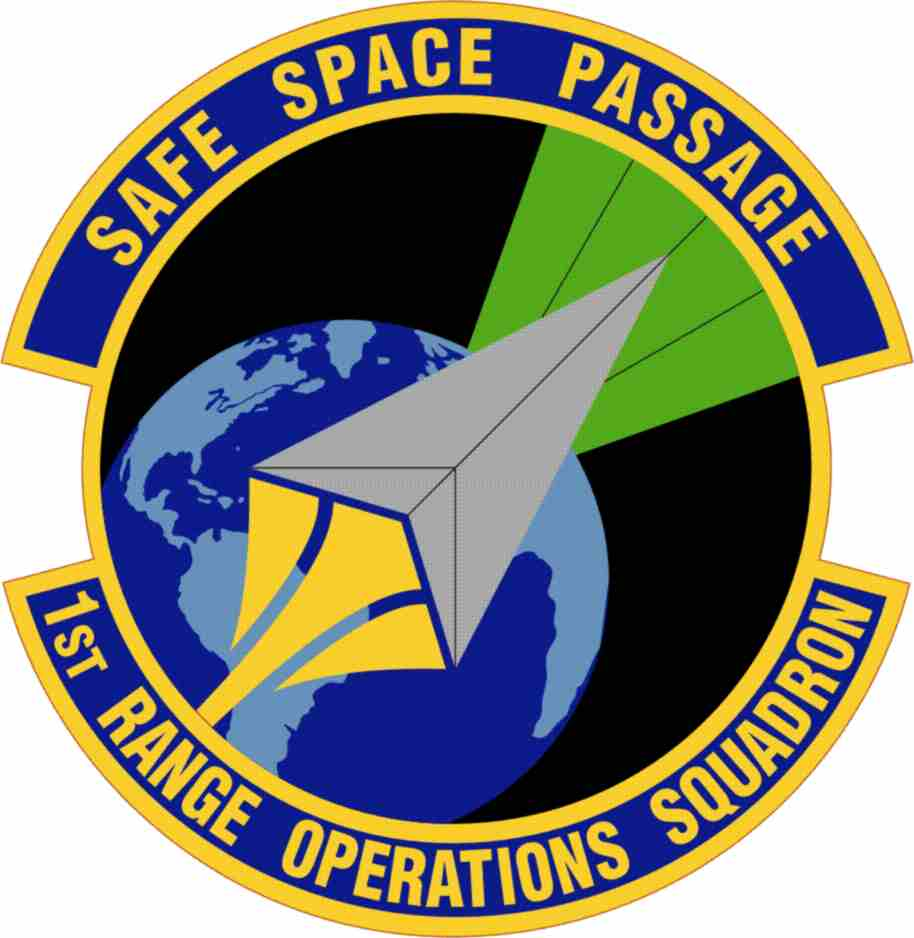
- Former 1st Range Operations Squadron emblem

The 1st Range Operations Squadron (1 ROPS) is a United States Space Force unit responsible for executing real-time command and control of the Eastern Range in support of spacelift operations, ballistic missile test and evaluation, and aeronautical test and evaluation. It is under Space Launch Delta 45 and headquartered at Patrick Space Force Base, Florida. It was activated on 1 December 2003.

== List of commanders ==
- Lt Col James E. Smith, August 2012 – May 2014
- Lt Col Mark J. Faulstich, 2 May 2016 – May 2016
- Lt Col Monique DeLauter, 23 May 2016 – June 2018
- Lt Col Gregory Vice, 14 June 2018 - 2020
- Lt Col Brian Eno, July 2020 - June 2022
- Lt Col Colin Mims, June 2022 – July 2024
- Lt Col Gregory Allen, July 2024 – present

== See also ==
- Space Launch Delta 45
