= Space Base Delta 1 =

United States Space Force installation command

- Delta emblem
- Founded: 24 July 2020 (6 years, 2 months and 22 days)
- Country: United States
- Branch: United States Space Force
- Type: Installation
- Size: 3,200 personnel
- Part of: United States Space Force Combat Forces Command
- Headquarters: Peterson Space Force Base, Colorado Springs, Colorado, U.S.

Commanders
- Commander: Col Charles J. Cooper
- Vice Commanders: Col Sarah S. Babbitt; Col Randy Combs
- Senior Enlisted Leader: CMSgt Martha M. Burkhead

Insignia
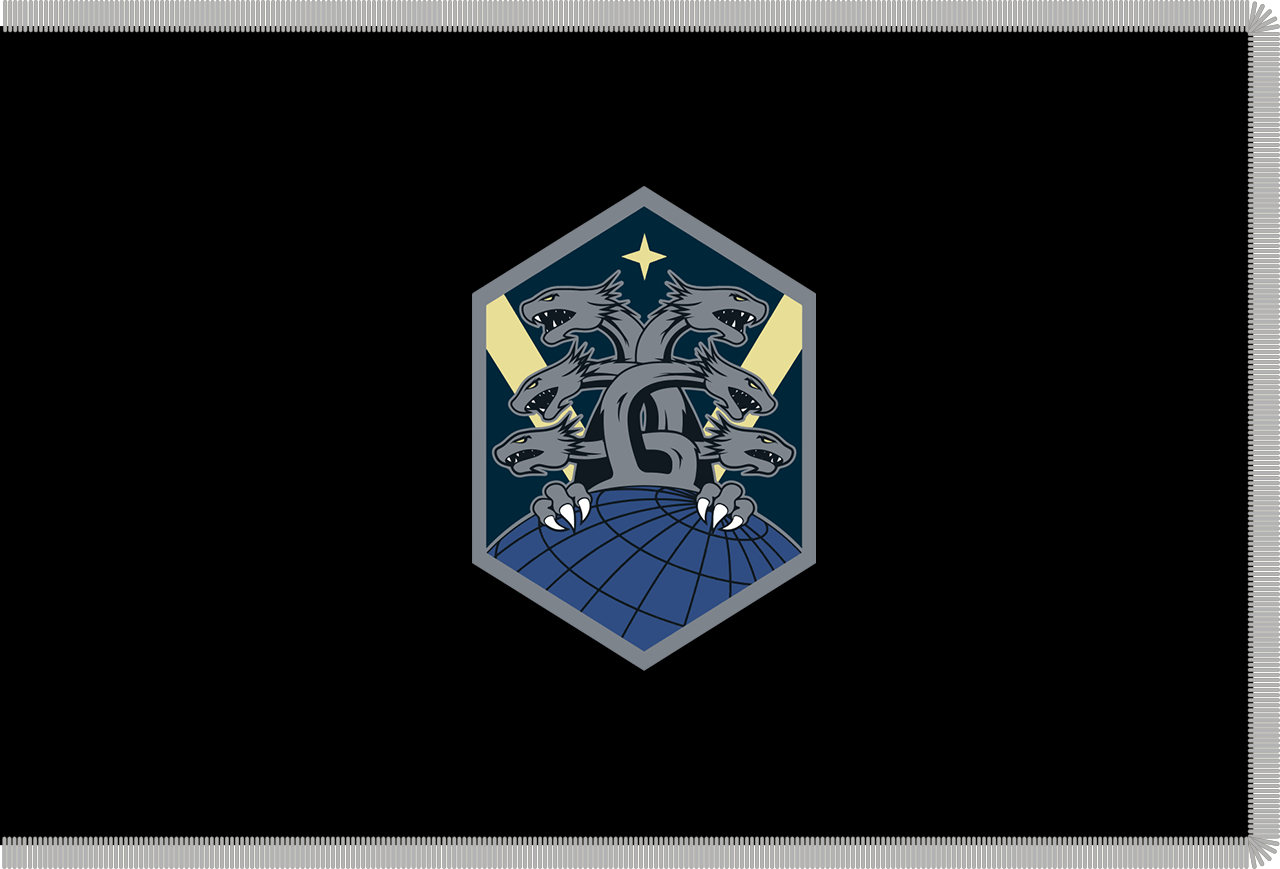
- SPACE BASE DELTA 1 FLAG

Space Base Delta 1 (SBD 1) is a United States Space Force unit. It is assigned to Space Force Combat Forces Command and headquartered at Peterson Space Force Base in Colorado Springs, Colorado, United States.

SBD 1 is responsible for Peterson Space Force Base, Schriever Space Force Base, and Cheyenne Mountain Space Force Station in Colorado; Pituffik Space Base in Greenland; New Boston Space Force Station in New Hampshire; and Kaena Point Space Force Station in Hawaii.

SBD1 oversees weapons safety at Peterson SFB, Cheyenne Mountain SFS, and Pituffik SB.

SBD 1 was formerly known as the Peterson-Schriever Garrison (P-S GAR) until its redesignation to Space Base Delta 1 on May 23, 2022. P-S GAR was activated on 24 July 2020, replacing the 21st Space Wing (based at the then Peterson Air Force Base) and the 50th Space Wing (based at the then Schriever Air Force Base).

== Structure ==
21st Mission Support (21 MS), Peterson Space Force Base

- 21st Civil Engineer Squadron (21 CES)
- 21st Communications Squadron (21 CS)
- 21st Contracting Squadron (21 CONS)
- 21st Force Support Squadron (21 FSS)
- 21st Logistics Readiness Squadron (21 LRS)
- 21st Security Forces Squadron (21 SFS)

21st Medical Group (21 MDG), Peterson Space Force Base

- 21st Dental Squadron (21 DS)
- 21st Healthcare Operations Squadron (21 HCOS)
- 21st Operational Medical Readiness Squadron (21 OMRS)
- 21st Medical Squadron (21 MDS), Schriever SFB

821st Space Base Group (821 SBG), Pituffik Space Base

- 821st Support Squadron (821 SPTS)
- 821st Security Forces Squadron (821 SFS)

== List of commanders ==
| No. | Commander | | Term | | | Ref. |
| No. | Portrait | Name | Took office | Left office | Duration | Ref. |
|---|---|---|---|---|---|---|
| 1 | James E. Smith | Colonel; James E. Smith | 24 July 2020 | 28 June 2021 | 339 days | - |
| 2 | Shay Warakomski | Colonel; Shay Warakomski | 28 June 2021 | 11 July 2022 | 1 year, 13 days | |
| 3 | David G. Hanson | Colonel; David G. Hanson | 11 July 2022 | 11 July 2024 | 2 years, 0 days | |
| 4 | Kenneth F. L. Klock | Colonel; Kenneth F. L. Klock | 11 July 2024 | 28 July 2026 | 2 years, 17 days | |
| 5 | Charles J. Cooper | Colonel; Charles J. Cooper | 28 July 2026 | Incumbent | 80 days | |
