= Devens, Massachusetts =

- Census-designated place
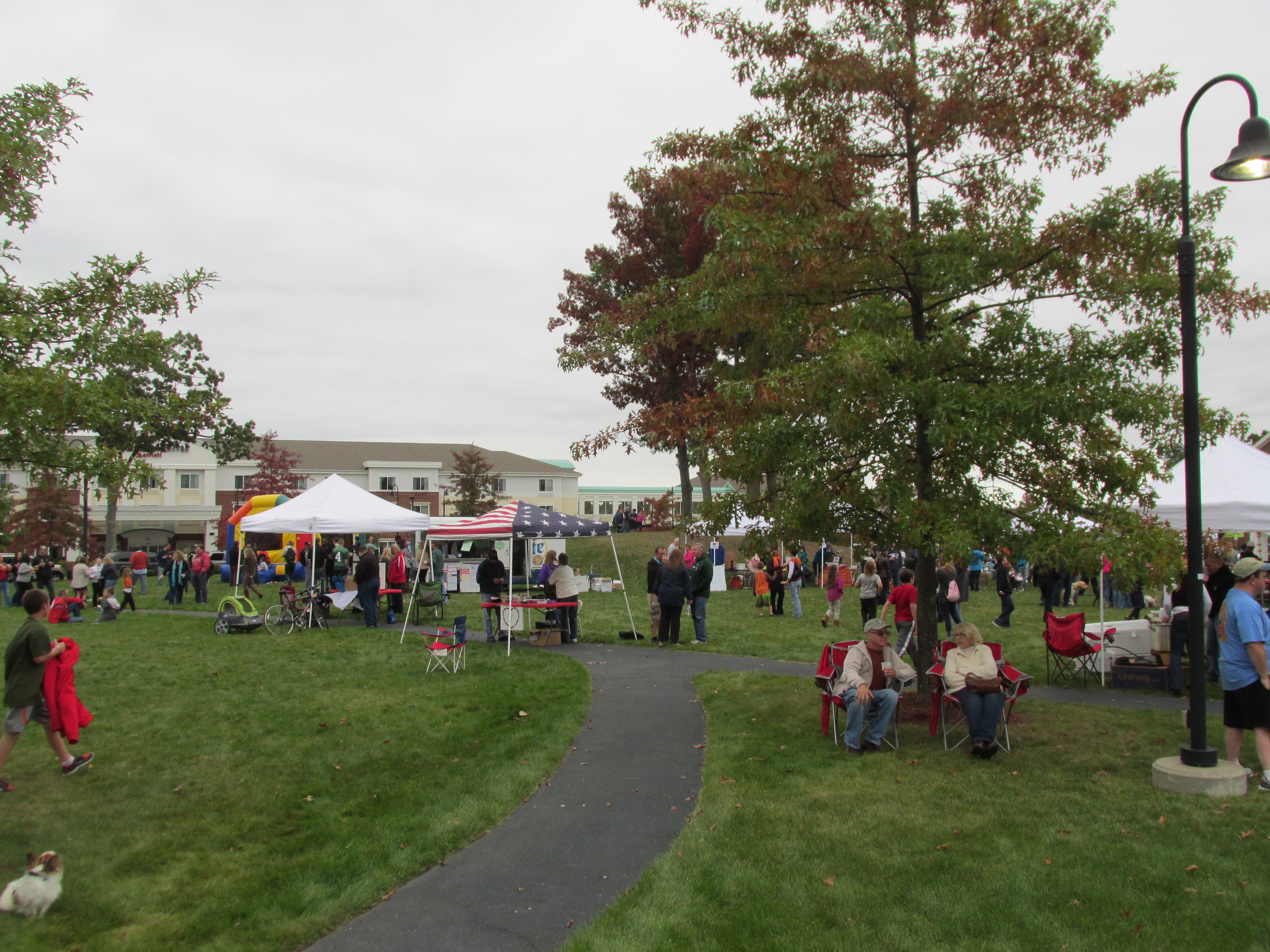
- Devens Charity Chili Cookoff
- Motto: "More Than a Home. A Community"
- Location in Worcester County and the state of Massachusetts.
- Coordinates: 42°32′14″N 71°36′56″W
- Country: United States
- State: Massachusetts
- Counties: Middlesex, Worcester
- Towns: Ayer, Shirley, Harvard

Area
  - Total: 6.87 sq mi (17.80 km^{2})
  - Land: 6.78 sq mi (17.57 km^{2})
  - Water: 0.089 sq mi (0.23 km^{2})

Population (2020)
  - Total: 1,697
  - Density: 250.1/sq mi (96.58/km^{2})
- Time zone: UTC-5 (Eastern (EST))
  - Summer (DST): UTC-4 (EDT)
- ZIP Codes: 01434 (Devens); 01432 (Ayer); 01464 (Shirley)
- Area code: 978
- FIPS code: 25-16840
- Website: www.devenscommunity.com

Devens is a regional enterprise zone and census-designated place in the towns of Ayer and Shirley (in Middlesex County) and Harvard (in Worcester County) in the U.S. state of Massachusetts. It is the successor to Fort Devens, a military post that operated from 1917 to 1996. The population was 1,697 at the 2020 census, down from 1,840 in 2010.

== History ==
The area itself is named after jurist and Civil War general Charles Devens. In 2011, the CDP tried to secede from Ayer, Shirley, and Harvard and become the 352nd town in the state but failed the vote. Some residents are still looking to secede to become a town.

=== Military use ===
The area operated as Camp Devens and later Fort Devens from 1917 to 1996. The Fort's sitting was due primarily to its location at a major hub of the rail network in New England. The U.S. Army base was officially closed in 1996 after 79 years of service. Some parcels were retained by the federal military for use as the Devens Reserve Forces Training Area, reactivated as a smaller Fort Devens in 2007.

=== Civilian use ===
The process for distribution of surplus land parcels on the former Fort Devens allowed the Federal Bureau of Prisons, Shriver Job Corps, Massachusetts National Guard, Massachusetts Veterans and MassDevelopment to acquire the land. The Bureau of Prisons established the Federal Medical Center, Devens, a prison hospital. The bulk of the land was purchased by MassDevelopment for $17 million. MassDevelopment is a quasi-public development authority that has been given the task of turning Devens into a residential and business community. Since the closing of the military base, many of the existing buildings have been renovated or reconstructed; housing developments now exist, along with a growing business park, a new hotel, restaurants, two disc golf courses and a golf course. Veterans of the Army Security Agency have also expressed interest in building a museum there, as Fort Devens was their principal training facility for more than two decades.

A comprehensive disposition process has been ongoing since 2003, charged with determining the future political governance of Devens. During 2005-06 it was determined that the governance scenario best suited for the regional stakeholders was to create a new independent town. On October 24, 2006, a vote to confirm the disposition recommendation for future governance was voted down by two of the six stakeholders, the adjoining towns of Harvard and Ayer (residents of Shirley, the Devens residents, MassDevelopment and the Devens Enterprise Commission supported the resolution). On November 7, 2006, during the state elections, the second opportunity to vote on Devens disposition had only Harvard voting against the scenario with the towns of Ayer and Shirley supporting Devens as a town. Devens's disposition will now be determined by another disposition process or by the state legislature. Residents of Devens vote in either Harvard or Ayer but still have no elected representatives that have municipal authority in Devens. MassDevelopment maintains the utilities (such as gas, electricity and water) and contracts out public safety services such as firefighting and police.

Devens is home to, among other enterprises, New England Studios, a film studio opened in 2014, the Devens branch of Werfen , a pharmaceutical company specializing in IVD systems, and Commonwealth Fusion Systems, a spinoff of the Massachusetts Institute of Technology which raised $1.8 billion in December 2021 to build a tokamak fusion device.

== Geography ==
Devens is on the boundary between Middlesex and Worcester counties, with approximately half in the northwestern part of the town of Harvard in northeastern Worcester County and the rest in the southeastern part of the town of Shirley and the western part of the town of Ayer in northwestern Middlesex County. The Devens CDP is bordered to the northeast by the village of Ayer and to the west by the village of Shirley.

Massachusetts Route 2 forms the southern edge of the community, with access from Exit 106. Route 2 leads west 7 miles (11 km) to the Leominster/Fitchburg area and east 16 miles (26 km) to Concord.

According to the U.S. Census Bureau, the Devens CDP has a total area of 6.87 square miles (17.79 km^{2}), of which 6.78 square miles (17.56 km^{2}) are land and 0.09 square miles (0.23 km^{2}), or 1.31%, are water. The Nashua River flows northward through the west side of the community, part of the Merrimack River watershed.

== Demographics ==
For demographic information about the area prior to 2010, see Fort Devens (CDP), Massachusetts.

Historical population
Census	Pop.	Note	%±
2010	1,840		—
2020	1,697		−7.8%
U.S. Decennial Census

=== 2020 census ===
As of the 2020 census, Devens had a population of 1,697. The median age was 42.6 years. 7.4% of residents were under the age of 18 and 10.7% of residents were 65 years of age or older. For every 100 females there were 447.4 males, and for every 100 females age 18 and over there were 486.6 males age 18 and over.

100.0% of residents lived in urban areas, while 0.0% lived in rural areas.

There were 189 households in Devens, of which 42.3% had children under the age of 18 living in them. Of all households, 50.3% were married-couple households, 16.9% were households with a male householder and no spouse or partner present, and 24.3% were households with a female householder and no spouse or partner present. About 19.0% of all households were made up of individuals and 10.0% had someone living alone who was 65 years of age or older.

There were 219 housing units, of which 13.7% were vacant. The homeowner vacancy rate was 9.2% and the rental vacancy rate was 3.1%.

Racial composition as of the 2020 census
Race	Number	Percent
White	1,040	61.3%
Black or African American	405	23.9%
American Indian and Alaska Native	24	1.4%
Asian	101	6.0%
Native Hawaiian and Other Pacific Islander	0	0.0%
Some other race	46	2.7%
Two or more races	81	4.8%
Hispanic or Latino (of any race)	294	17.3%

== Government ==
Devens residents are represented at two levels:

- An elected committee, the Devens Committee. that is an advisory committee to MassDevelopment. The committee has five members with a chair, vice-chair and secretary
- Some residents living outside of Devens proper are represented by the town governments of the Towns of Ayer (northeast) and Harvard (southeast).

== Nuclear fusion facility ==
Commonwealth Fusion Systems, an MIT spinoff, raised $1.8 billion in December 2021 to build a tokamak fusion device, called SPARC, at a scale intended to achieve “net energy,” that is, it is expected to output more energy than required to sustain its nuclear fusion reactions. The company is building this facility in Devens. The full-scale machine is planned to be fully operational by 2027.

== Education ==
Devens is a non-operating school district. It currently contracts with the town of Harvard for educating its children. However, Devens is the home of the Francis W. Parker Charter Essential School. Parker is a public charter school with students from about 30 towns in the central Massachusetts area.

== Places of interest ==
With the exception of the U.S. Army Garrison Fort Devens cantonment area, the Devens Reserve Forces Training Area, and the Federal Medical Center prison, most of the former Fort Devens area has been returned to civilian use.

Of interest to the general public in Devens:

- Oxbow National Wildlife Refuge is located to the south side of the former Fort Devens base.
- Fort Devens Historic District is located to the north of the former Fort Devens.
- The Fort Devens Museum (94 Jackson Rd, #305) is a small museum on the history of Fort Devens from 1917 to the present
