= James E. Smith (general) =

U.S. Space Force general

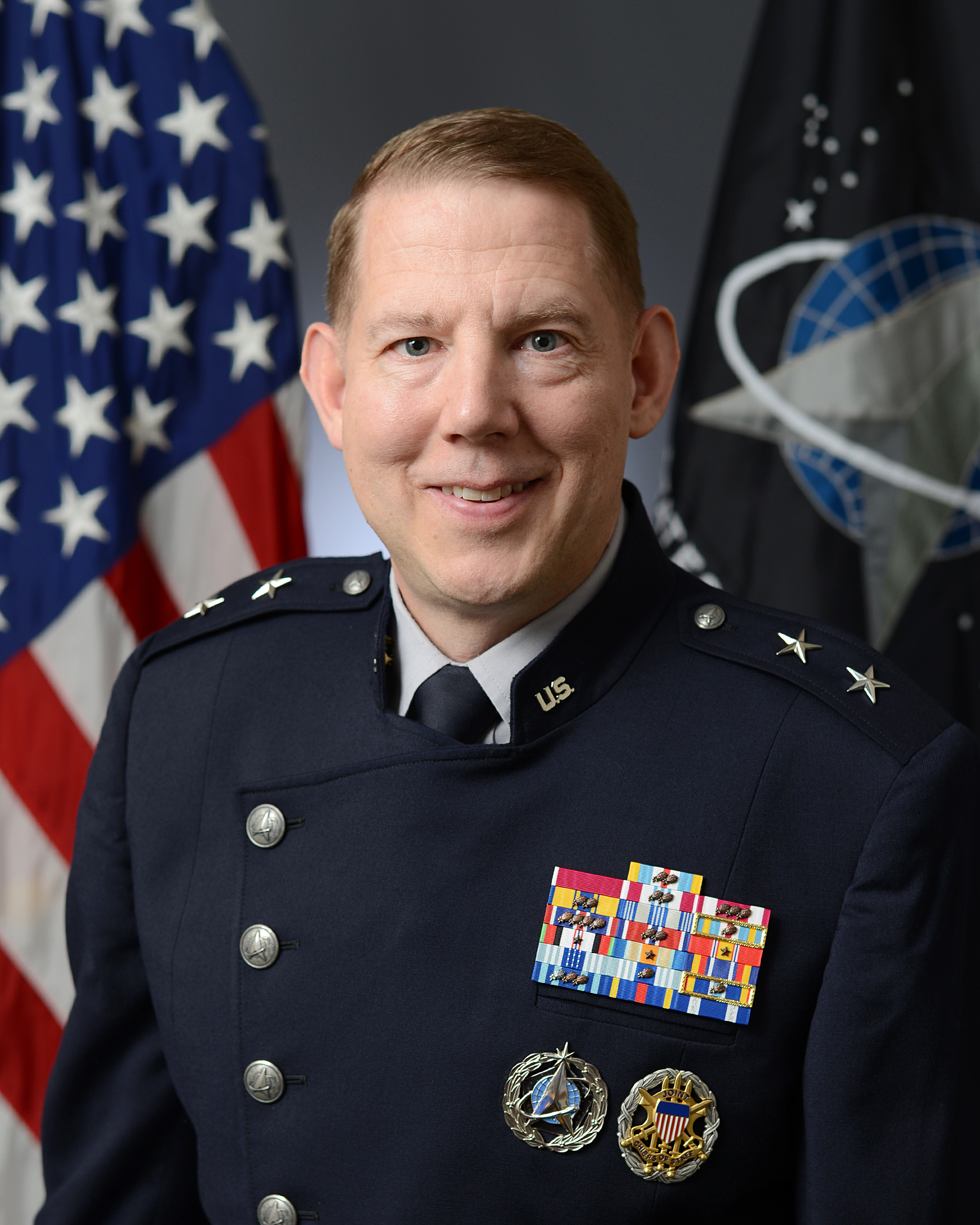
- Official portrait, 2024
- Born: January 10, 1973 (age 53); Boise, Idaho, U.S.
- Alma mater: United States Air Force Academy (BS): Massachusetts Institute of Technology (MS)
- Military career
- Allegiance: United States
- Branch: United States Air Force: United States Space Force
- Service years: 1997–2021 (Air Force): 2021–present (Space Force)
- Rank: Major General
- Commands: Space Training and Readiness Command: Peterson-Schriever Garrison; 50th Space Wing; Air Force Element, RAF Menwith Hill; 1st Range Operations Squadron
- Awards: Defense Superior Service Medal (2): Legion of Merit

James Earl Smith (born January 10, 1973) is a United States Space Force major general who serves as the commander of Space Training and Readiness Command. He previously served as the vice director for joint force development at the Joint Staff. He also served as the assistant deputy chief of space operations for operations, cyber, and nuclear, deputy United States military representative to the North Atlantic Treaty Organization, and commander of the Peterson-Schriever Garrison.

Smith was commissioned in 1997 as the top graduate of the United States Air Force Academy. His operations experience includes directing range support for launch operations from the Eastern Range, Cape Canaveral, Fla., and providing command and control for national reconnaissance and Global Positioning System spacecraft. He transferred to the U.S. Space Force in April 2021.

== Education ==
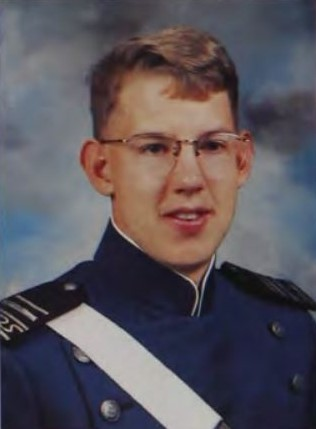
Smith as a cadet at the U.S. Air Force Academy

James Earl Smith was born in Boise, Idaho, on January 10, 1973. In 1991, he graduated from Meridian High School, during which he worked as a paperboy for the Idaho Statesman.

- 1997 Bachelor of Science, Astronautical Engineering and Japanese language minor, U.S. Air Force Academy, Colorado Springs, Colo.
- 1999 Master of Science, Aeronautics and Astronautics, Mass. Institute of Technology, Cambridge
- 2001 Squadron Officer School, Maxwell Air Force Base, Ala.
- 2003 Air Force Intern Program, Pentagon, Washington, D.C.
- 2003 Certificate Program, Organizational Management, George Washington University, Washington, D.C.
- 2007 Air Command and Staff College, Maxwell AFB, Ala. by correspondence
- 2010 Master of Airpower Art and Science, School of Advanced Air and Space Studies, Maxwell AFB, Ala.
- 2012 Air War College, Maxwell AFB, Ala., by correspondence
- 2017 Master of Science, National Resource Strategy, Dwight D. Eisenhower School for National Security and Resource Strategy, Washington, D.C.
- 2018 Enterprise Leadership Seminar, University of North Carolina, Chapel Hill
- 2022 Capstone General and Flag Officer Course, National Defense University, Fort McNair, Washington, D.C.
- 2024 Advanced Senior Leader Development Seminar, Warrenton, Va.

== Military career ==
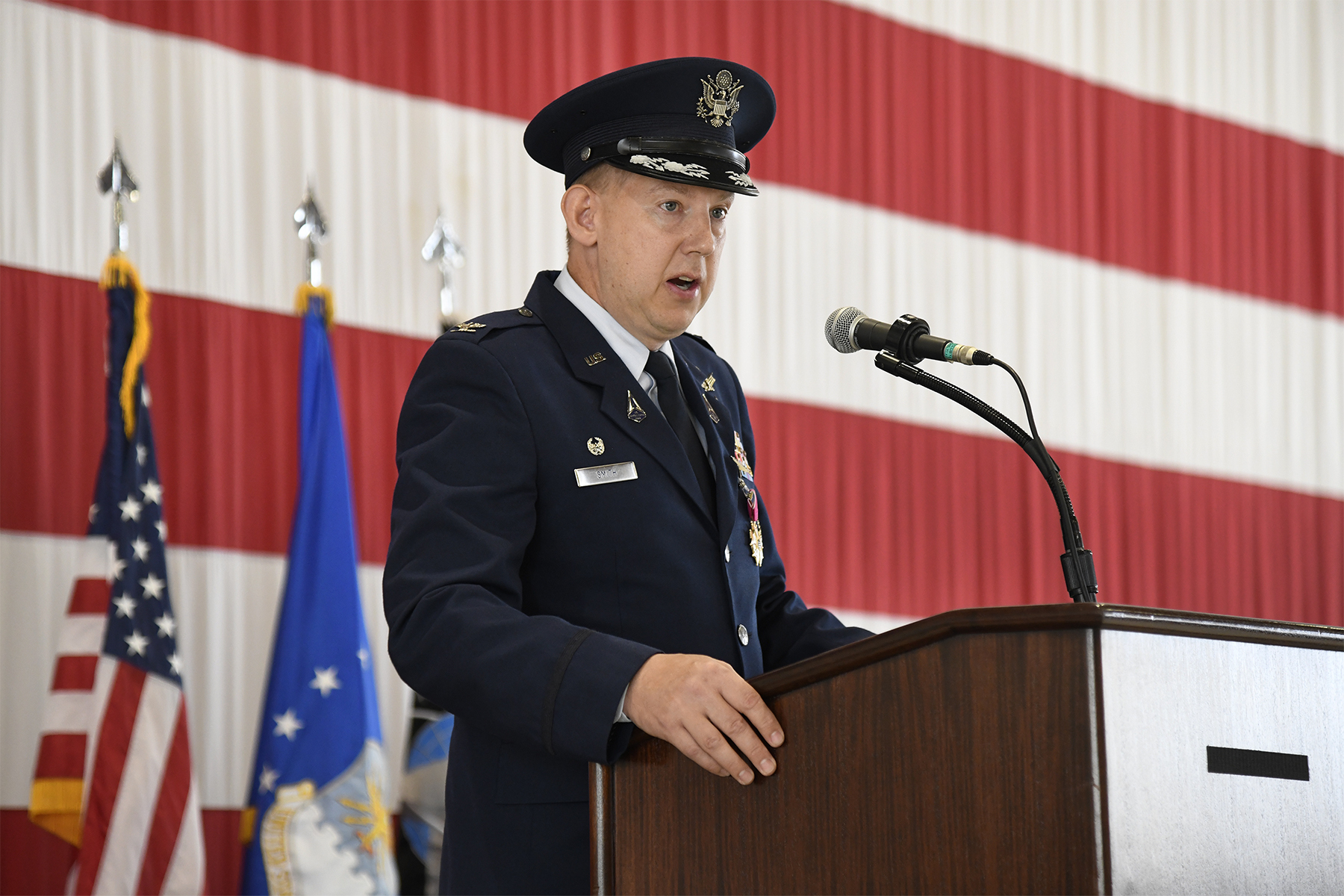
Smith speaks after relinquishing command of Peterson-Schriever Garrison in 2021

In 2020, Smith was nominated for transfer to the United States Space Force. A year later, he was nominated for promotion to brigadier general.

In April 2024, Smith was nominated for promotion to major general. His nomination was confirmed on May 2, 2024. He was promoted to major general on June 21, 2024, and assigned as vice director joint force development of the Joint Staff. He is the first Space Force officer to hold a vice director position in the Joint Staff.

=== Assignments ===
1. May 1997 - May 1999, Graduate Student and Charles Stark Draper Fellow, Massachusetts Institute of Technology, Cambridge, Mass.
2. May 1999 - June 2002, Spacecraft Systems Engineer and Chief, GPS Spacecraft Systems Analysis, 2nd Space Operations Squadron, Schriever AFB, Colo.
3. June 2002 - June 2003, Intern, Air Force Intern Program, the Pentagon, Washington, D.C.
4. July 2003 - May 2006, Chief, Space Control Demonstration Operations Flight and Wing Executive Officer, Space Superiority Materiel Wing, Space and Missile Systems Center, Los Angeles AFB, Calif.
5. June 2006 - June 2008, Chief, Space Operations Division and Assistant Operations Officer, Space Operations Squadron, Aerospace Data Facility - Colorado, Buckley AFB, Colo.
6. July 2009 - June 2010, Student, School of Advanced Air and Space Studies, Maxwell AFB, Ala.
7. July 2010 - July 2012, Chief, Mission Area Architecting Branch, Directorate of Requirements, Headquarters Air Force Space Command, Peterson AFB, Colo. (January 2012 - June 2012, Program Manager and Acting Commander, Defense Contract Management Agency-Northern Afghanistan, Bagram Airfield, Afghanistan)
8. August 2012 - May 2014, Commander, 1st Range Operations Squadron, Cape Canaveral AFS, Fla.
9. May 2014 - May 2015, Assistant Executive Officer to the Chief of Staff of the United States Air Force, Headquarters U.S. Air Force, the Pentagon, Washington, D.C.
10. June 2015 - June 2016, Chief, Air Force and Air Defense Security Assistance Team, Office of Security Cooperation-Iraq, U.S. Embassy, Baghdad, Iraq
11. July 2016 - June 2017, Student, Dwight D. Eisenhower School for National Security and Resource Strategy, Fort Lesley J. McNair, Washington, D.C.
12. June 2017 – June 2019, Commander, Air Force Element, and Chief, Mission Operations & Engineering, RAF Menwith Hill, United Kingdom.
13. June 2019 – July 2020, Commander, 50th Space Wing, Schriever AFB, Colo.
14. July 2020 – June 2021, Commander, Peterson-Schriever Garrison, Peterson AFB, Colo.
15. July 2021 – July 2023, Deputy U.S. Military Representative to the NATO Military Committee, NATO Headquarters, Brussels, Belgium
16. July 2023 – June 2024, Assistant Deputy Chief of Space Operations, Operations, Cyber, and Nuclear, Headquarters, United States Space Force, Washington D.C.
17. June 2024–July 2025, Vice Director for Joint Force Development, J-7, the Joint Staff, the Pentagon, Arlington, Va.
18. July 2025–present, Commander, Space Training and Readiness Command, U.S. Space Force, Patrick SFB, Fla.

== Awards and decorations ==
Smith is the recipient of the following awards:

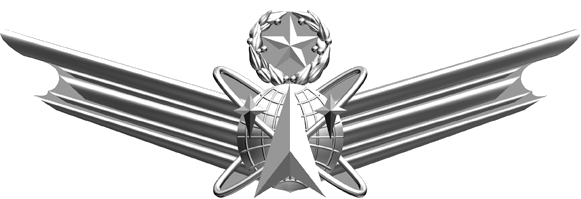
Command Space Operations Badge

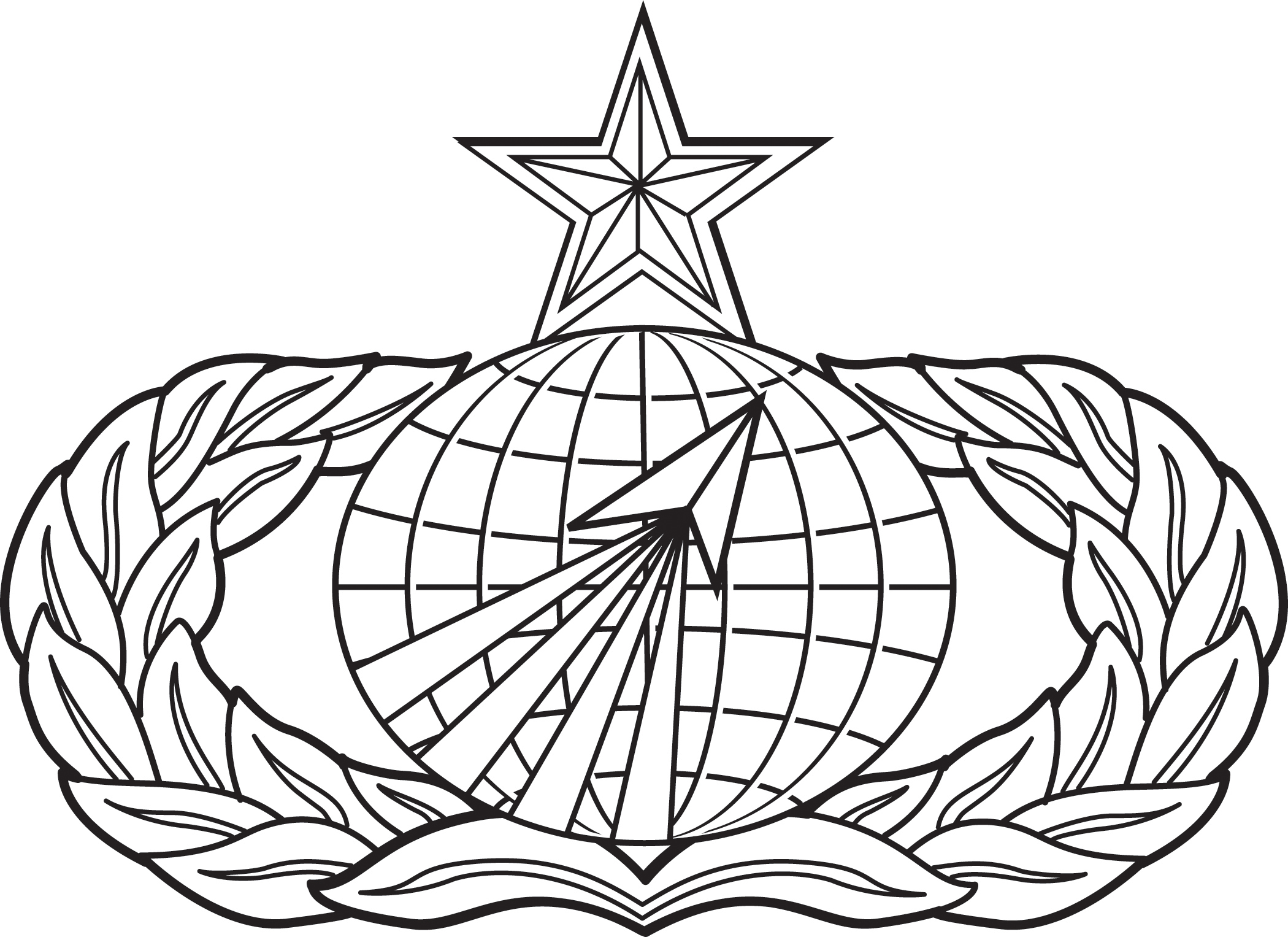

Senior Acquisitions and Financial Management Badge

Office of the Joint Chiefs of Staff Identification Badge

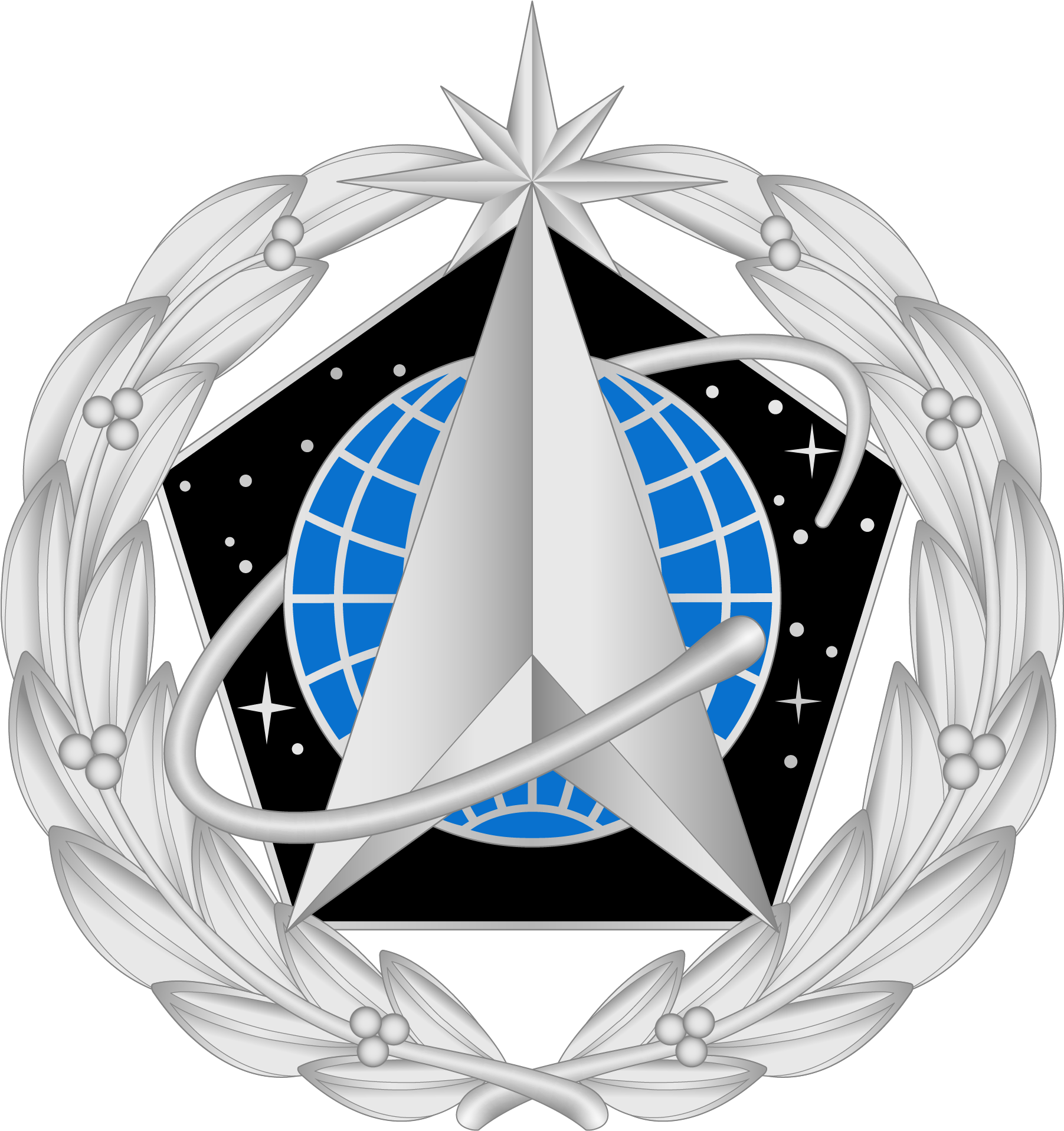

Space Staff Badge

Defense Superior Service Medal with one bronze oak leaf cluster
Legion of Merit
Defense Meritorious Service Medal with two bronze oak leaf clusters
Meritorious Service Medal with three bronze oak leaf clusters
Air Force Commendation Medal with two bronze oak leaf clusters
Air Force Achievement Medal
Joint Meritorious Unit Award
Air Force Outstanding Unit Award with four bronze oak leaf clusters
Air Force Organizational Excellence Award with two bronze oak leaf cluster
National Defense Service Medal with one bronze service star
Afghanistan Campaign Medal with one bronze service star
Inherent Resolve Campaign Medal with one bronze service star
Global War on Terrorism Service Medal
Air Force Overseas Short Tour Service Ribbon
Air Force Overseas Long Tour Service Ribbon and one bronze oak leaf cluster
Air Force Expeditionary Service Ribbon with gold frame and one bronze oak leaf cluster
Air Force Longevity Service Award with one silver and one bronze oak leaf cluster
Air Force Training Ribbon
NATO Medal

== Writings ==
- Application of Optimization Techniques to the Design and Maintenance of Satellite Constellations (PDF) (M.S.). School of Advanced Air and Space Studies. June 2010. Archived (PDF) from the original on November 2, 2021.
- One Size Fits? All Assessment of the National Space based Intelligence, Surveillance, and Reconnaissance Strategy (PDF) (M.S.). Massachusetts Institute of Technology. October 25, 1999. Archived (PDF) from the original on November 2, 2021.

== Dates of promotion ==
Rank	Branch	Date
Second Lieutenant	Air Force	May 28, 1997
First Lieutenant	Air Force	May 28, 1999
Captain	Air Force	May 28, 2001
Major	Air Force	November 1, 2006
Lieutenant Colonel	Air Force	December 1, 2011
Colonel	Air Force	May 1, 2016
Colonel	Space Force	~September 30, 2020
Brigadier General	Space Force	July 3, 2022
Major General	Space Force	June 21, 2024

Military offices
Preceded by Todd R. Moore	Commander of the Air Force Element at RAF Menwith Hill; 2017–2019	Succeeded by ???
Preceded by Jennifer L. Grant	Commander of the 50th Space Wing; 2019–2020	Command inactivated
New office	Commander of Peterson-Schriever Garrison; 2020–2021	Succeeded by Zachary S. Warakomski
Preceded by Christopher S. Sage	Deputy United States Military Representative to the North Atlantic Treaty Organization; 2021–2023	Succeeded by Sean M. Flynn
Preceded by Troy Endicott	Assistant Deputy Chief of Space Operations for Operations, Cyber, and Nuclear; 2023–2024	Succeeded by Shay Warakomski
Preceded by Patrick L. Gaydon	Vice Director for Joint Force Development of the Joint Staff; 2024–2025	Succeeded by Troy Endicott
Preceded by Timothy Sejba	Commander of Space Training and Readiness Command; 2025–present	Incumbent
