= Shay Warakomski =

U.S. Space Force officer

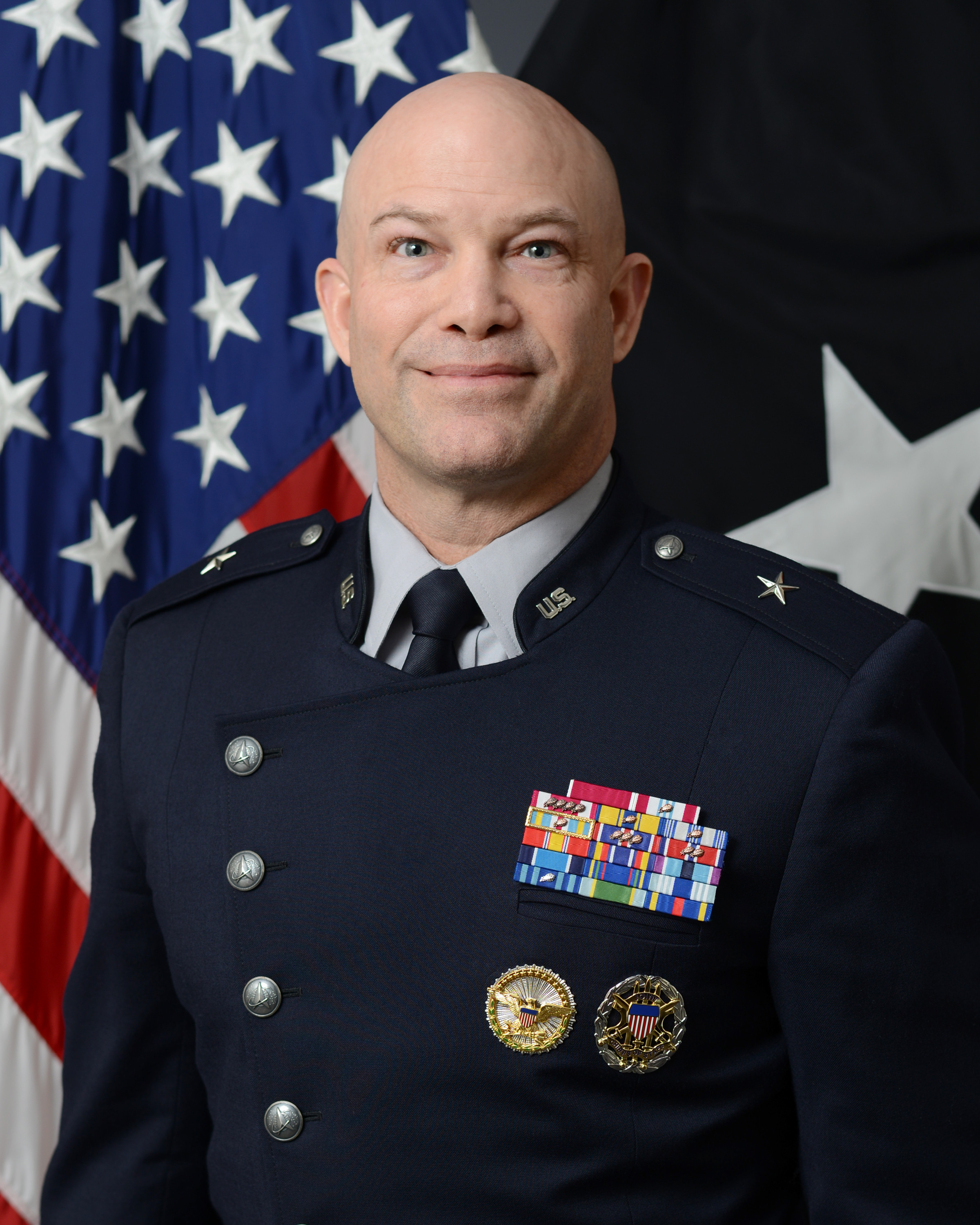
- Official portrait, 2025
- Born: October 15, 1975 (age 51); Lilburn, Georgia, U.S.
- Alma mater: United States Air Force Academy (BS); University of Colorado Colorado Springs (MBA)
- Military career
- Allegiance: United States
- Branch: United States Air Force: United States Space Force
- Service years: 1998–2020 (Air Force): 2020–present (Space Force)
- Rank: Brigadier General
- Commands: Space Base Delta 1; 375th Communications Group; 56th Communications Squadron
- Awards: Legion of Merit

Zachary Shay Warakomski (born October 15, 1975) is a United States Space Force brigadier general who served as the commander of Space Base Delta 1. He now serves as the vice director of joint force development of the Joint Staff.

== Early life and education ==
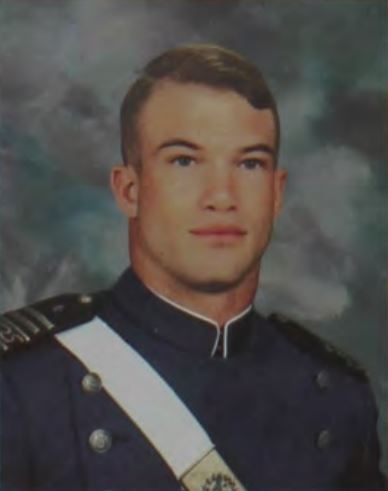
Cadet Warakomski

Zachary Shay Warakomski was born on October 15, 1975, in Lilburn, Georgia. His grandfather was a United States Army officer who served during the Vietnam War.

Warakomski was nominated to the United States Naval Academy by Senator Paul Coverdell. In 1994, he graduated from Parkview High School and entered the United States Air Force Academy. He also received the 1994 The Atlanta Journal-Constitution Cup, an award given to graduating seniors in Atlanta for academic excellence, school and community activities, and leadership.

- 1998 Bachelor of Science, Biology, U.S. Air Force Academy, Colorado Springs, Colo.
- 1999 Basic Communications Officer Training Course, Keesler Air Force Base, Miss.
- 2002 Squadron Officer School, Maxwell AFB, Ala.
- 2004 Master of Business Administration, University of Colorado, Colorado Springs
- 2007 Advanced Communications Officer Training Course, Keesler AFB, Miss.
- 2007 Air Command and Staff College, by correspondence
- 2010 Army Command and General Staff College, Fort Leavenworth, Kan.
- 2012 Air War College, by correspondence
- 2017 Master of National Security Strategy, National War College, Fort Leslie J. McNair, Washington, D.C.

== Military career ==
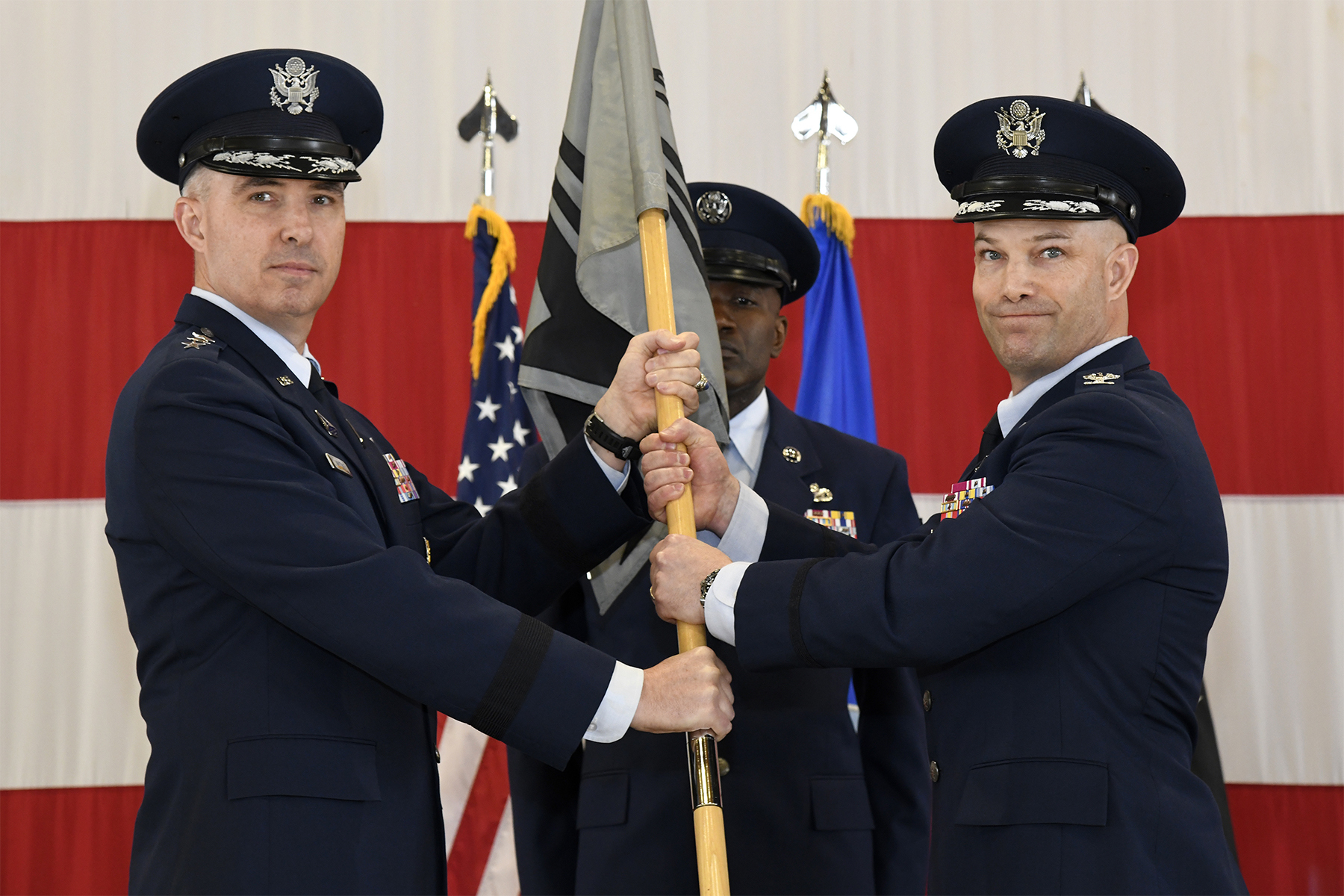
Warakomski receives the guidon of Peterson-Schriever Garrison, later redesignated as Space Base Delta 1, from Lt Gen Whiting, 2021

In 2024, Warakomski was nominated and confirmed for promotion to brigadier general. On July 18, 2024, he was promoted to brigadier general by Major General Douglas Schiess. On June 21, he took over as assistant deputy chief of space operations for operations, cyber, and nuclear for Major General James E. Smith who became the vice director for joint force development at the Joint Staff.

=== Assignments ===
1. May 1998–November 1998, Deputy Commander, Mission Systems Flight, 437th Communications Squadron, Charleston Air Force Base, S.C.
2. November 1998–February 1999, student, Basic Communications Officer Training Course, Keesler AFB, Miss.
3. February 1999–May 2000, Commander, Plans and Programs Flight, 437th Communications Squadron, Charleston AFB, S.C.
4. May 2000–May 2003, Chief, Systems Integration, Directorate of Operational Plans and Joint Matters, DCS, Air and Space Operations, Pentagon, Washington, D.C.
5. May 2003 – April 2005, Combat Infrastructure action officer, Networks Division, Directorate of Communications and Information, Headquarters Pacific Air Forces, Hickam AFB, Hawaii
6. April 2005–August 2006, Action Officer, Commander's Action Group, Headquarters PACAF, Hickam AFB, Hawaii
7. August 2006–August 2008, assistant director of Operations, 4th Space Operations Squadron, 50th Space Wing, Schriever AFB, Colo.
8. August 2008–February 2009, Chief Military Satellite Communications Systems, Capabilities Division, Directorate of Communications and Information, Headquarters Air Force Space Command, Peterson AFB, Colo.
9. February 2009–December 2009, Commander's Speechwriter, Commander's Action Group, Headquarters AFSPC, Peterson AFB, Colo.
10. January 2010–December 2010, Student, Army Command and General Staff College, Fort Leavenworth, Kan.
11. April 2011–June 2013, Commander, 56th Communications Squadron, Luke AFB, Ariz.
12. June 2013–July 2014, Executive Assistant to the Department of Defense Chief Information Officer, Office of the Secretary of Defense, Pentagon, Washington, D.C.
13. July 2014–January 2015, Action Officer, Cyberspace Division, Directorate for C4/Cyber, Joint Staff J6, Pentagon, Washington, D.C.
14. January 2015–July 2016, Special Assistant to the chairman, Office of the Chairman of the Joint Chiefs of Staff, Pentagon, Washington, D.C.
15. July 2016 – June 2017, student, National War College, Fort Leslie J. McNair, Washington, D.C.
16. June 2017 – June 2018, deputy director, Cyberspace Plans and Strategy, 24th Air Force, Air Forces Cyber and Joint Force Headquarters-Cyber (Air Force), Joint Base San Antonio – Lackland, Texas
17. June 2018–May 2019, Director, Cyberspace Operations – Integrated Planning Element, U.S. Transportation Command, and U.S. Cyber Command Liaison Officer to U.S. Transportation Command, Scott AFB, Ill.
18. May 2019–June 2021, Commander, 375th Communications Group, Scott AFB, Ill.
19. June 2021–July 2022, Commander, Peterson-Schriever Garrison, Peterson AFB, Colo.
20. August 2022–July 2023, Deputy Commander, Combined Force Space Component Command, Vandenberg AFB, Cal.
21. July 2023–June 2024, Senior Cyber Officer, Headquarters United States Space Force, Washington, D.C.
22. June 2024–September 2025, Assistant Deputy Chief of Space Operations, Operations, Cyber, and Nuclear, Headquarters United States Space Force, Washington D.C.

== Awards and decorations ==
Warakomski is the recipient of the following awards:

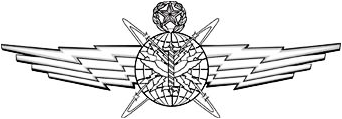

Master Cyberspace Operator Badge
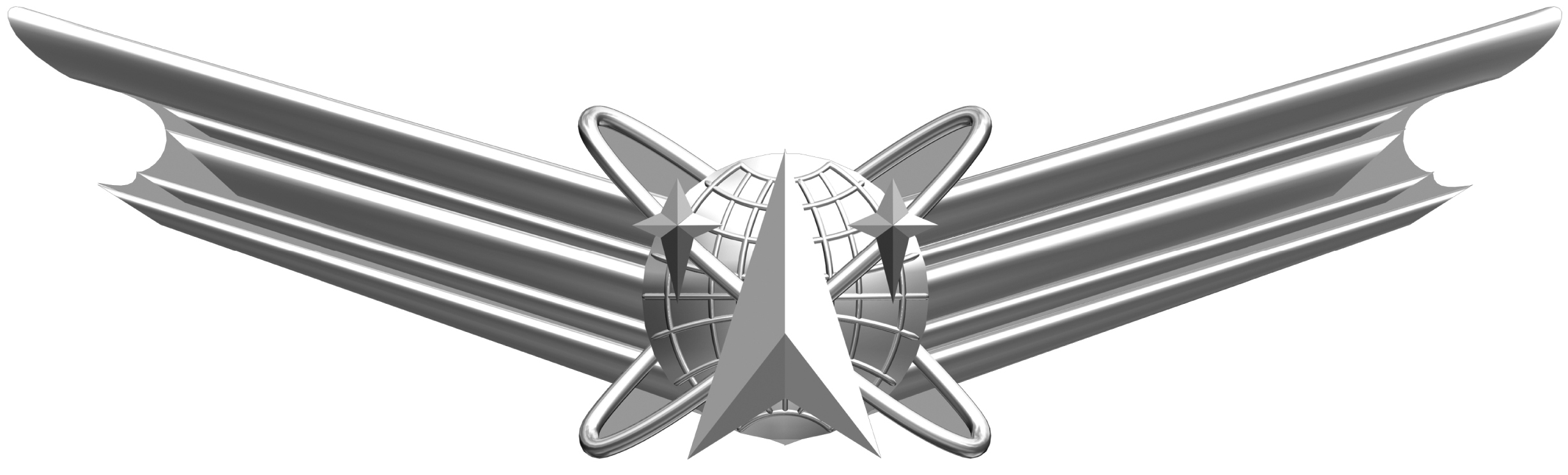
Basic Space Operations Badge

Office of the Secretary of Defense Badge

Office of the Joint Chiefs of Staff Identification Badge

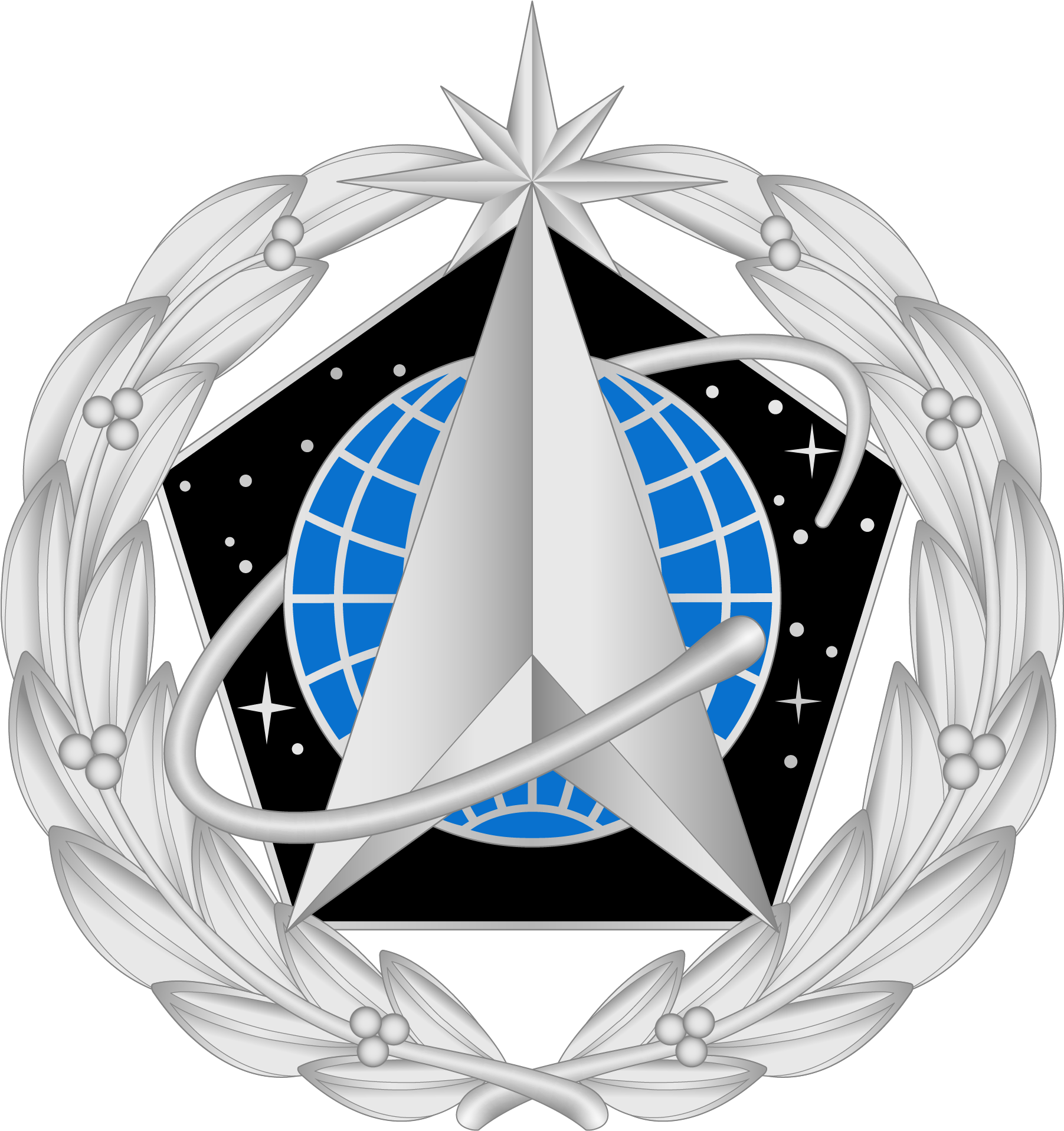

Space Staff Badge

Legion of Merit
Meritorious Service Medal with one bronze oak leaf cluster
Meritorious Service Medal with four bronze oak leaf clusters
Air Force Commendation Medal with one bronze oak leaf cluster
Air Force Achievement Medal with one bronze oak leaf cluster
Joint Meritorious Unit Award with one bronze oak leaf cluster
Air Force Outstanding Unit Award with three bronze oak leaf clusters
Air Force Organizational Excellence Award with two bronze oak leaf clusters
National Defense Service Medal
Global War on Terrorism Service Medal
Humanitarian Service Medal
Remote Combat Effects Campaign Medal
Nuclear Deterrence Operations Service Medal
Air Force Overseas Long Tour Service Ribbon
Air Force Longevity Service Award with one silver oak leaf cluster
Small Arms Expert Marksmanship Ribbon
Air Force Training Ribbon

== Dates of promotion ==
Rank	Branch	Date
Second Lieutenant	Air Force	May 27, 1998
First Lieutenant	Air Force	May 27, 2000
Captain	Air Force	May 27, 2002
Major	Air Force	December 1, 2007
Lieutenant Colonel	Air Force	October 1, 2012
Colonel	Air Force	January 1, 2019
Colonel	Space Force	~September 30, 2020
Brigadier General	Space Force	June 7, 2024

Military offices
Preceded by Marc L. Packler	Commander of the 375th Communications Group; 2019–2021	Succeeded by Kyle Baldassari
Preceded by James E. Smith	Commander of Space Base Delta 1; 2021–2022	Succeeded by David G. Hanson
Preceded by Michael E. Conley	Deputy Commander of the Combined Force Space Component Command; 2022–2023	Succeeded by Dennis Bythewood
Preceded by John P. Smail	Senior Cyber Officer of the United States Space Force; 2023–2024	Position disestablished
Preceded by James E. Smith	Assistant Deputy Chief of Space Operations for Operations, Cyber, and Nuclear; 2024–2025	Succeeded by Nick Hague
Preceded by Troy Endicott	Vice Director of Joint Force Development of the Joint Staff; 2025–present	Incumbent
