= Shirley (CDP), Massachusetts =

Shirley, Massachusetts
- Census-designated place
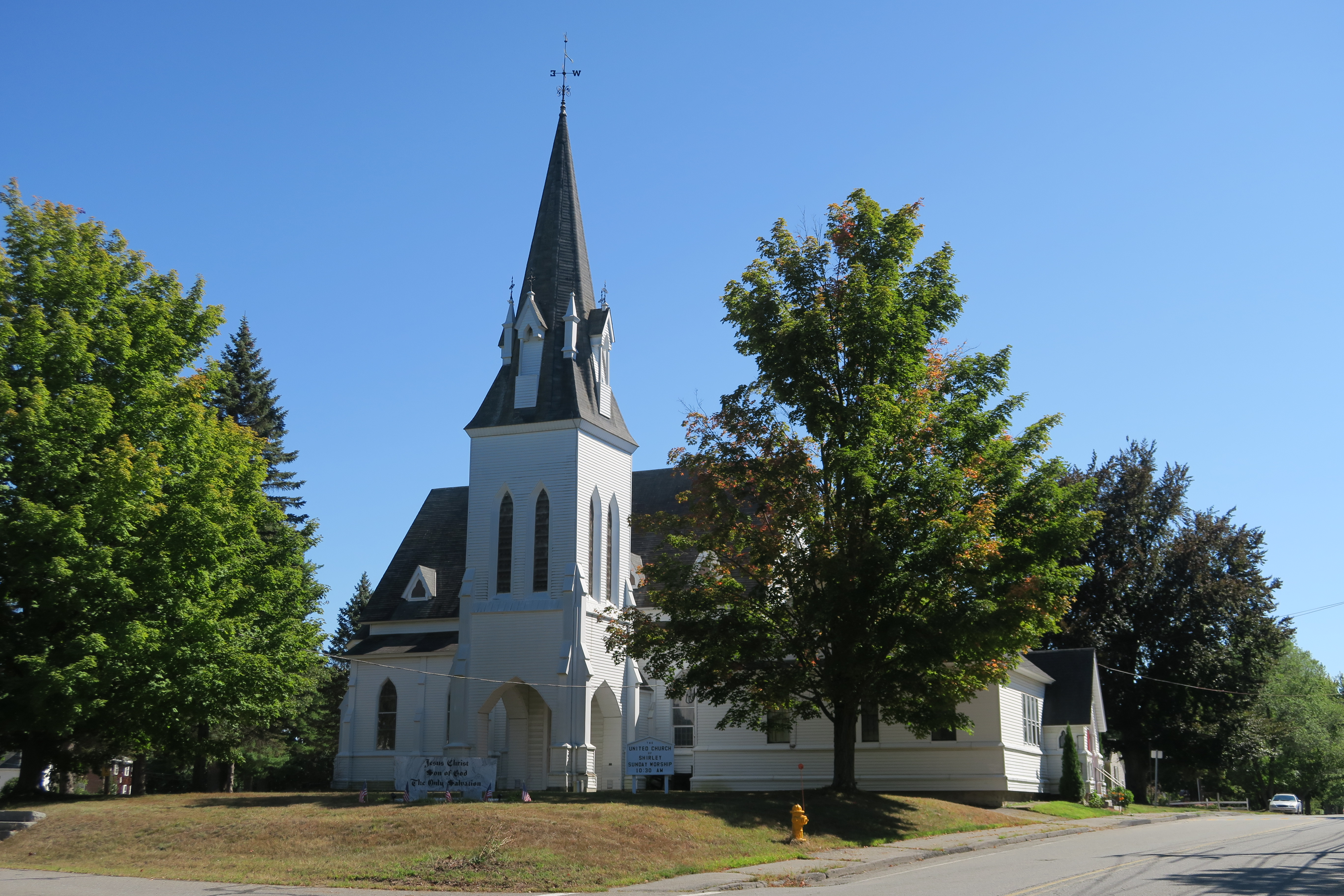
- The United Church of Shirley

- Location in Middlesex County in Massachusetts
- Coordinates: 42°32′36″N 71°39′4″W
- Country: United States
- State: Massachusetts
- County: Middlesex
- Town: Shirley

Area
  - Total: 1.34 sq mi (3.46 km^{2})
  - Land: 1.32 sq mi (3.41 km^{2})
  - Water: 0.015 sq mi (0.04 km^{2})
- Elevation: 285 ft (87 m)

Population (2020)
  - Total: 1,611
  - Density: 1,222.1/sq mi (471.87/km^{2})
- Time zone: UTC-5 (Eastern (EST))
  - Summer (DST): UTC-4 (EDT)
- ZIP code: 01464
- Area code: 978
- FIPS code: 25-61555
- GNIS feature ID: 0610789

Shirley is a census-designated place (CDP) comprising the main village in the town of Shirley in Middlesex County, Massachusetts, United States. The population was 1,611 at the 2020 census, out of 7,431 in the entire town of Shirley.

== Geography ==
The village of Shirley is located in northwestern Middlesex County at 42°32′36″N 71°39′04″W (42.54324, -71.650987), in the southern part of the town of Shirley. It is bordered to the east by the Devens regional enterprise zone and to the south by the town of Lancaster in Worcester County. The western edge of the CDP follows Bow Brook, a tributary of Catacoonamug Brook, which flows through the village center and joins the Nashua River in Devens.

No numbered state highways run through the village. It is 7 miles (11 km) east of Leominster and 3 miles (5 km) southwest of Ayer.

According to the United States Census Bureau, the Shirley CDP has a total area of 1.34 square miles (3.47 km^{2}), of which 0.02 square miles (0.05 km^{2}), or 1.27%, are water.

== Demographics ==
Historical population
| Census | Pop. | Note | %± |
|---|---|---|---|
| 1950 | 1,082 | | — |
| 1960 | 1,762 | | 62.8% |
| 1970 | 1,718 | | −2.5% |
| 1980 | 1,630 | | −5.1% |
| 1990 | 1,559 | | −4.4% |
| 2000 | 1,427 | | −8.5% |
| 2010 | 1,441 | | 1.0% |
| 2020 | 1,611 | | 11.8% |
U.S. Decennial Census

As of the census of 2000, there were 1,427 people, 632 households, and 343 families residing in the CDP. The population density was 408.1 people/km^{2} (1,057 people/mi^{2}). There were 664 housing units at an average density of 189.9 units/km^{2} (492 units/mi^{2}). The racial makeup of the CDP was 92.15% White, 3.99% Black or African American, 0.07% Native American, 1.82% Asian, 0.42% from other races, and 1.54% from two or more races. Hispanic or Latino of any race were 2.03% of the population.

There were 632 households, out of which 26.7% had children under the age of 18 living with them, 40.0% were married couples living together, 10.3% had a female householder with no husband present, and 45.7% were non-families. 38.9% of all households were made up of individuals, and 14.1% had someone living alone who was 65 years of age or older. The average household size was 2.26 and the average family size was 3.08.

In the CDP, the population was spread out, with 23.2% under the age of 18, 7.0% from 18 to 24, 33.6% from 25 to 44, 21.4% from 45 to 64, and 14.9% who were 65 years of age or older. The median age was 39 years. For every 100 females, there were 94.7 males. For every 100 females age 18 and over, there were 93.6 males.

The median income for a household in the CDP was $40,956, and the median income for a family was $56,950. Males had a median income of $40,742 versus $32,143 for females. The per capita income for the CDP was $22,256. About 5.4% of families and 6.2% of the population were below the poverty line, including 4.5% of those under age 18 and none of those age 65 or over.
