= Veterans Inc. =

American non-profit organization

- Founded: Worcester, Massachusetts (1990)
- Type: Non-profit, Interest group
- Location: Administrative Headquarters in Worcester, Massachusetts Shrewsbury, Massachusetts Devens, Massachusetts Bradford, Vermont Lewiston, Maine New Britain, Connecticut Pawtucket, Rhode Island Concord, New Hampshire
- Services: temporary and emergency housing, counseling, employment services, job training, family programs, benefits counseling and advocacy, transportation, temporary financial assistance, health and wellness, food services, childcare services
- Fields: Human Services
- Key people: Lt. Colonel Vincent Perrone USAF (Retired), President Denis Leary, Executive Director
- Website: www.veteransinc.org

Veterans Inc. (formerly known as The Central Massachusetts Shelter for Homeless Veterans and Massachusetts Veterans Inc.) is an American non-governmental, and 501(c)(3) non-profit organization founded in 1990. Its headquarters are in Worcester, Massachusetts. Veterans Inc. offers a range of services to support homeless veterans, including transitional housing, and facilitates connections with mental health services and job training.

The organization's mission is to give shelter to honorably-served veterans who have lost their homes and suffer from other possible disabilities.

== History ==
Veterans Inc. was founded in 1990 by a group of Vietnam War veterans who were dismayed by the impact of homelessness on their former service members.

In 1991, the organization took possession of its Grove Street facility, a long-abandoned building.

Veterans Inc. opened its doors in January 1992 to house homeless veterans.

In 2023, Veterans Inc. was honored with the distinguished HIRE Vets Medallion Award from among 319 other organizations by the U.S. Department of Labor in recognition of its exceptional support in recruiting, hiring, and retaining employees with military backgrounds.

Since June 1991, Veterans Inc. has maintained its tax-exempt status as a 501(c)(3) organization.

== Program ==
The organization's annual "Stand Down" event in Worcester offers a range of services and resources, including food, clothing, personal-care items, and a career fair featuring employment and training services. In 2024, Veterans Inc. executive director Denis Leary described the Stand Down as the organization's "most looked forward to event of the year."

Veterans Inc. hosted its 20th annual "Stand Down" resource fair on June 13, 2025. The event featured more than 180 providers and employers, and the organization reported that it had served approximately 1,200 veterans over the past two decades.

== Finances ==
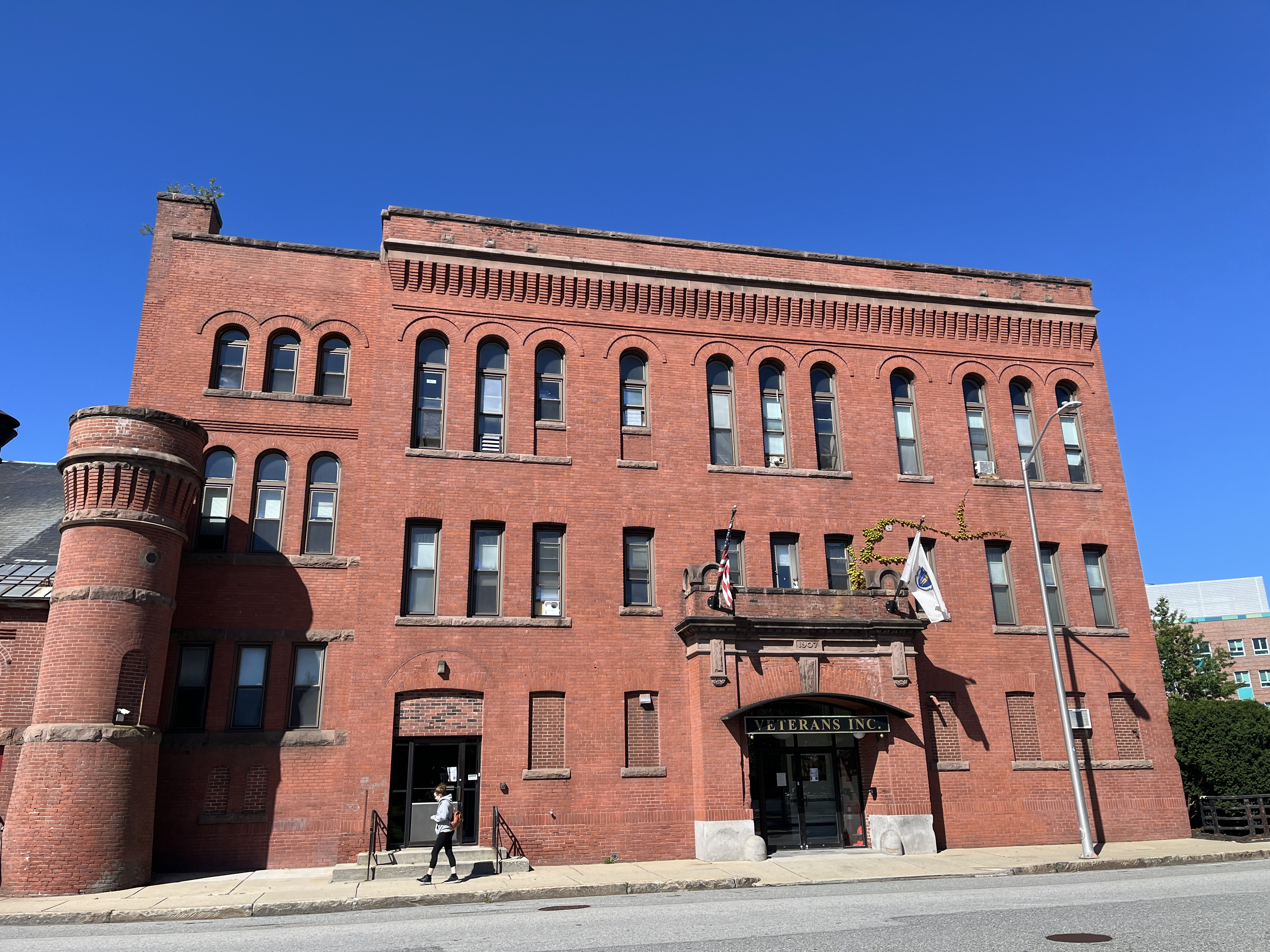
Veterans Inc. Headquarters in Worcester

In 2024, Veterans Inc. was designated as a recipient of $2.5 million in Congressionally Directed Spending through the Department of Housing and Urban Development's Community Development Fund for a project entitled "Housing Homeless Veterans".

The funding was allocated to facilitate upgrades to Veterans Inc.'s transitional housing facility, encompassing enhancements to residential spaces designated for veterans confronted with behavioral health challenges.

In 2024, Veterans Inc. reported total assets amounting to $29.5 million.
