= Fort Devens (CDP), Massachusetts =

Fort Devens, Massachusetts
- Former CDP
- Interactive map of Fort Devens, Massachusetts
- Coordinates: 42°32′14″N 71°36′56″W
- Country: United States
- State: Massachusetts
- County: Middlesex; Worcester

Area
  - Total: 3.25 sq mi (8.43 km^{2})
  - Land: 3.21 sq mi (8.31 km^{2})
  - Water: 0.046 sq mi (0.12 km^{2})
- Elevation: 614 ft (187 m)

Population (2000)
  - Total: 1,017
  - Density: 317/sq mi (122.4/km^{2})
- Time zone: UTC-5 (Eastern (EST))
  - Summer (DST): UTC-4 (EDT)
- Area code: 508

Fort Devens was a census-designated place (CDP) in the towns of Ayer and Shirley, in Middlesex County and Harvard in Worcester County in the U.S. state of Massachusetts. It encompassed the former Fort Devens. The population was 1,017 at the 2000 census. Prior to the 2010 census, the area was redefined as the Devens census-designated place.

== Geography ==
Fort Devens is located at 42°32′14″N 71°36′56″W (42.537137, -71.615493).

According to the United States Census Bureau, the Fort Devens CDP had a total area of 17.7 km^{2} (6.8 mi^{2}). 17.4 km^{2} (6.7 mi^{2}) of it is land and 0.2 km^{2} (0.1 mi^{2}) of it (1.32%) is water..

== Demographics ==
As of the census of 2000, there were 1,017 people, 3 households, and 1 family residing in the CDP. The population density was 151.1/mi^{2} (58.3/km^{2}). There were 316 housing units at an average density of 46.9/mi^{2} (18.1/km^{2}). The racial makeup of the CDP was 57.23% White, 32.45% African American, 0.39% Native American, 2.46% Asian, 6.69% from other races, and 0.79% from two or more races. Hispanic or Latino of any race were 35.89% of the population.

There were 3 households, out of which 1 had children under the age of 18 living with them, 1 was a married couple living together, and 2 were non-families. None had a female householder with no husband present. 2 of the households were made up of individuals, and 2 had someone living alone who was 65 years of age or older. The average household size was 2 and the size of the only family was 4. 1,011 of the 1,017 residents were listed as living in group quarters.

In the CDP, the population was spread out, with 9.6% under the age of 18, 21.6% from 18 to 24, 51.1% from 25 to 44, 15.9% from 45 to 64, and 1.7% who were 65 years of age or older. The median age was 32 years. For every 100 females, there were 850.5 males. For every 100 females age 18 and over, there were 1,251.5 males.

The median income for a household in the CDP was $0, and the median income for a family was $0. Males had a median income of $19,423 versus $0 for females. Only 78 residents were listed as being in the labor force. The per capita income for the CDP was $10,354. About 78.6% of the population were below the poverty line, including no persons under the age of 18 and none ages 65 or older.
