= Fort Devens =

Historic US Army post in Middlesex and Worcester counties, Massachusetts

- Part of United States Army
- Ayer / Shirley / Harvard, Massachusetts, U.S.
- Old postcard of Army cantonment at Camp Devens during World War I

Site information
- Type: Fort
- Owner: United States Army
- Open to the public: Partially

Location
- Coordinates: 42°30′26″N 71°40′00″W

Site history
- Built: 1917
- Built by: United States Army
- In use: 1917–present
- Battles/wars: World War I World War II; Korean War; Vietnam War; Persian Gulf War; War in Afghanistan; Iraq War

Fort Devens is a United States Army Reserve military installation in the towns of Ayer and Shirley, in Middlesex County and Harvard in Worcester County in the U.S. state of Massachusetts. Due to extensive environmental contamination it was listed as a superfund site in 1989. Most of the fort's land was sold off in 1996, but the cantonment area of the post was retained by the Army as the Devens Reserve Forces Training Area (RFTA). Fort Devens was reactivated in May 2007, though no units of active Army have been located there. The Devens Range Complex operates on property in Lancaster, south of Route 2, for live-fire training with small arms, machine guns, grenades, and rockets.

In 2011, the fort had a population of 306 enlisted personnel, 2,151 reservists, 348 civilians, and 1,399 family members, and maintained 25 ranges, 21 training areas, and 15 maneuver areas on nearly 5,000 acres (20 km^{2}) of land. It was home to the United States Army Base Camp Systems Integration Laboratory as well as the United States Army System Integration Laboratory.

Part of the former area of the military base is now home to Federal Medical Center, Devens, a federal prison for male inmates requiring specialized or long-term medical or mental health care.

== History ==
=== Establishment during World War I ===
Camp Devens, named after jurist and Civil War general Charles Devens, was established on September 5, 1917, as a temporary cantonment for training soldiers during World War I. About 5,000 acres (2,000 ha) of land was leased then later purchased from 112 owners who sold 230 parcels of land in the towns of Ayer, Harvard, Lancaster and Shirley by the federal government. Some was fine farmland along the Nashua River and other was "sprout" land where trees had been cut leaving stumps.

The Fort's siting was due primarily to its location at a major hub of the rail network in New England. Construction, by the largest labor force assembled in the United States, to build an entire city for 10,000 requiring barracks, training buildings, water and sewer systems, raced at the rate of 10.4 new buildings every day. It was a reception center for war selectees and became a demobilization center after the war. As one of 16 temporary cantonments, Camp Devens processed and trained more than 100,000 soldiers. Three divisions (the 12th, the 26th and the 76th) were activated and trained at Devens during the war.

In 1918, Camp Devens, was afflicted by the late 1918 deadly second wave of the 1918 flu pandemic. Approximately 850 soldiers, mostly privates, died at the camp during 1918 from the Spanish flu.

=== Between World Wars ===
In 1918, it became a separation center for over 150,000 troops upon their return from France. Put on inactive status, it served next as a summer training camp for National Guardsmen, Reservists and ROTC cadets.

In 1920, following years of debate regarding preparedness for another global war, passage of the National Defense Act established an important role for the citizen army.

In 1927, appropriations were made for permanent construction of buildings, but the stock market crash nearly called a halt. Congresswoman Edith Nourse Rogers, of Lowell, recognized the economic significance of Camp Devens to this largely agricultural community.

In 1929, Robert Goddard briefly used the post for his rocket operations.

In 1931, through Congresswoman Rogers' efforts, Camp Devens became Fort Devens, a permanent US Army post in 1931. However, during the depression, construction was slow; most of the work was done by the Works Progress Administration. A few years later, Fort Devens Army Airfield was established.

=== World War II ===
In 1940, at the onset of World War II, Fort Devens was designated a reception center for all men in New England who would serve one year as draftees. A massive $25 million building project was begun, including more than 1200 wooden buildings and an airfield. The 1st, 32nd, and 45th Divisions trained at Devens during the war. Devens also housed a prisoner-of-war camp for German and Italian prisoners from 1944 to 1946. It was designated as early as 1942 for detaining enemy aliens of Italian, German and Japanese birth.

=== Post World War II ===
The 7th Infantry Regiment, 3rd Infantry Division was located at Fort Devens from 1946 to 1950. Already at reduced strength, the regiment was further decimated when a battalion from Fort Devens was reflagged as the 3d Battalion, 8th Cavalry Regiment, and sent to Korea to join the 1st Cavalry Division. The 7th Infantry deployed to San Francisco, California and sailed for Japan on 20 August 1950, arriving on 16 September 1950 to marry-up with the 15th Infantry Regiment and the division headquarters.

Fort Devens hosted the Army Security Agency Training Center & School (ASATC&S) from April 1951 to 1996. In the 1950s or 1960s the fort was home to the 56th Air Defense Artillery Brigade, part of 1st Region, Army Air Defense Command.

On 15 February 1958 the 2nd Infantry Brigade was reactivated at Fort Devens, Massachusetts as the Pentomic 2nd Infantry Brigade with its own shoulder sleeve insignia. It spent the next five years training in northern Massachusetts and Cape Cod. The Brigade was prepared to support the Marines landing in the 1958 Lebanon crisis but did not deploy.

- Headquarters & Headquarters Company
- 1st Battle Group, 4th Infantry
- 2nd Battle Group, 60th Infantry
- 1st Battalion, 76th Artillery
- Company F, 34th Armor
- Company G, 34th Armor
- Troop F, 5th Cavalry
- Brigade Trains
- Two engineer companies

The 2nd Infantry Brigade was inactivated on 19 February 1963 at Fort Devens; in 1962 when it was reflagged as 2d Brigade, 5th Infantry Division. It was reactivated on 23 October 1963 as Headquarters and Headquarters Company, 2nd Brigade, 1st Infantry Division and moved (with the rest of the Division) to Fort Riley, Kansas in January 1964.

From 1968 to 1995, Fort Devens was the home of the 10th Special Forces Group. It also served as a training center for members of the Army Reserve and National Guard.

=== Units remaining near base closure ===
Fort Devens was the home of the 10th Special Forces Group (Airborne), less 1st Battalion based in (West) Germany, from 1968 until the Group's move to Fort Carson, Colorado in 1995. It was also the home of the 39th Engineer Battalion (CBT) until the 39th was inactivated in 1992. The 39th Engineer (CBT) was reactivated in 2014 at Fort Campbell, Kentucky. The Army Security Agency Training Center & School (ASATC&S) was established at Devens in April 1951. In 1976 it became known as the U.S. Army Intelligence School, Devens, or USAISD, and was moved to Fort Huachuca, Arizona in 1996. The 36th Medical Battalion including the 595th Medical Company and the 46th Combat Support Hospital, the 46th CSH was inactivated July 15, 1994. Finally, the 624th Military Police Company was stationed until the post closed. Headquarters, Army Readiness Region I and Readiness Group Devens were also located there in the late 1970s and early 1980s. The mission was to assist the training of reserve component units, state National Guard and Army Reserve units in New York and New England. Other subordinate Readiness Groups were located at Secena Army Depot and Fort Hamilton in NYC. Exact establishment dates and/or inactivation dates could not be found.

=== Closure, 1996 ===
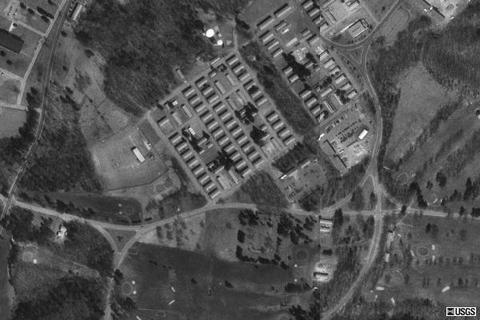
Barracks as seen from the air in 1995, now demolished

The U.S. Army post which resided at Fort Devens was officially closed in 1996 after 79 years of service.

The Base Realignment and Closure process for land distribution for all parcels on the former Fort Devens allowed the Federal Bureau of Prisons, Shriver Job Corps, Massachusetts National Guard, Massachusetts Veterans and MassDevelopment to acquire the land. The bulk of the land was purchased by MassDevelopment for $17 million with the aim of turning Devens into a residential and business community. The Bureau of Prisons used its land for the Federal Medical Center, Devens, a prison hospital.

Since the closing of the military base, many of the existing buildings have been renovated or reconstructed; housing developments now exist, along with a growing business park, a new hotel, restaurants, several public and private schools, a disc golf course, and a golf course. Veterans of the Army Security Agency have also expressed interest in building a museum there as Fort Devens was their principal training facility for nearly 25 years.

=== More recent ===
Devens became a United States Army Reserve installation under the command the Army Installation Management Command (IMCOM) with an Army Reserve, Massachusetts Army National Guard and Marine Corps Reserve presence. In 2007 the headquarters of the 94th Regional Readiness Command, which was responsible for the command and control of Army Reserve units throughout New England, as well as providing Army Reserve support for Federal Emergency Management Agency operations in the New England region, was disbanded under the consolidation of forces and buildings within the area came under the control of the 99th Regional Support Command, which is located at Fort Dix, New Jersey, and whose Commanding General serves as the Senior Commander for Ft. Devens. The units with the original 94th Regional Readiness Command were realigned with similar commands along the East Coast. The base still remained an active training site for Reserve and National Guard Forces as well as regional law enforcement agencies.

The Army announced in 2008 that it would build a new training center in the area. This was dedicated in 2011 as the David S. Connolly Armed Forces Reserve Center. The three buildings total 280,000 square feet and are on 57 acres. It also supported 650 Army Reserve and Army National Guard Soldiers and Marines, and included space to store nearly 800 military vehicles. The total cost was $100 million.

In January 2011 a group of Devens residents filed a citizens' petition for Devens to become a legally incorporated town. Efforts to make Devens the state's 352nd town failed on the local level in 2006. As of 2018, Devens is "a regional enterprise zone and census-designated place in the towns of Ayer and Shirley, in Middlesex County and Harvard in Worcester County," (see Fort Devens (CDP), Massachusetts).

In March 2021, Commonwealth Fusion Systems established a 47-acre commercial site within the former Fort Devens. This facility is to be used for development and manufacture of fusion power equipment and plants, none of which were yet in commercial use anywhere worldwide as of 2021.

== Units ==
The following military units are based at this location:

- 3411th Military Intelligence Detachment
- 3417th Military Intelligence Detachment
- 3437th Military Intelligence Detachment
- 366th Military Police Detachment (CID)
- 401st Chemical Company
- Headquarters Company, 25th Marine Regiment
- Headquarters and Service Company & Weapons Company 1st Battalion, 25th Marines
- Detachment 1 J2/JT, United States Central Command, Army Reserve Element (ARE)
- 395th Combat Sustainment Support Battalion
- 77th Sustainment Brigade
- 804th Medical Brigade
- USNSCC Recruit Training Command New England (Summer only)
- 756th Combat Engineer Company

== Environmental contamination ==
On December 21, 1989, Fort Devens was listed as superfund because historic underground storage tanks/fuel depots had contaminated soils with heavy metals and petroleum products.

In 2016, the Army started looking for PFAS, which it detected in groundwater and in the municipal water supply wells for Devens and the Town of Ayer. In May 2021, Restoration Advisory Board community members were concerned about PFAs making their way into the Nashua River, especially with water from the river being used to irrigate crops in communities downstream. They also discussed progress of the pump and treat system to get dissolved arsenic and iron at the 84-acre Shepley's Hill landfill site out of the groundwater remediation. As of 2022, there is ongoing groundwater remediation at the former Moore Army Airfield and the former Shepley's Hill Landfill in addition to long-term groundwater monitoring at four petroleum contaminated sites.

== Cemetery ==
Fort Devens has a cemetery which has the graves of U.S. military personnel, their dependents and about 20 German and Italian prisoners of war who died there either during or shortly after World War II. A number of graves predate the fort's establishment as they were relocated after the closure of several coast defense forts in Boston Harbor after World War II.

The oldest grave is that of 1st Lieutenant Robert F. Massie of the Corps of Artillery, who was killed in a sword duel with First Lieutenant Gustavus S. Drane at Fort Independence, in Boston Harbor, on Christmas Day 1817. The legend that Lieutenant Drane mysteriously disappeared after the duel and his remains were later discovered in a walled off part of Fort Independence is not true. In reality, Drane was later promoted to captain and continued to serve in the Army until his death in 1846. Massie was originally buried at Fort Independence, and his remains were relocated to Fort Devens, along with others buried at Forts in Boston Harbor, in the 1950s after the forts were closed.

Lieutenant Edward John Kent Johnson of the Confederate States Navy died as a prisoner of war at Fort Warren in 1863. He was originally buried at Fort Warren but his remains were moved to Deer Island and Governors Island in Boston Harbor before being moved to Fort Devens in 1939. In 2002 his remains were finally returned to his home state of Florida.

== In media ==
The Jack Benny Program broadcast on December 20, 1942 was recorded at Fort Devens.

The fort is the setting for the play "Court-Martial at Fort Devens" by Jeffrey Sweet. Based on a true story, it tells of two Black WACs at the fort during World War II who went on strike after facing prejudicial treatment, and were subsequently court-martialed.

== See also ==
- List of military installations in Massachusetts
- Devens, Massachusetts
- Fort Devens, Massachusetts (CDP)
