= Dalton (surname) =

Dalton is a surname of Norman origin found in Ireland and Britain and places where people from those backgrounds emigrated to. The Hiberno-Norman D'Alton (later Dalton) family controlled an area of the Irish midlands following the Norman invasion and assimilation into Ireland. An unrelated, prominent Norman-Irish gentry family of the toponymic surname de Antōn arose in Co. Kilkenny in the late thirteenth century; their surname was later corrupted to Daton or Dalton.

Notable people with the surname include:

== A–H ==
- Abby Dalton (1935–2020), American actress
- Albert Clayton Dalton (1867–1957), United States military officer
- Andy Dalton (American football) (born 1987), American football player
- Andy Dalton (rugby union) (born 1951), New Zealand rugby player
- Annie Charlotte Dalton (1865–1938), Canadian poet
- Antico Dalton (born 1975), American player of American and Canadian football
- Aoife Dalton (born 2003), Irish rugby union footballer
- Ashley Dalton (elected 2023), British politician
- Audrey Dalton (born 1934), Irish actress
- Barney Dalton, Australian rugby league player
- Bobby Dalton (born 1998), English boxer
- Booker Dalton (1869–1948), American politician from Virginia
- Brad Dalton (born 1959), Australian basketball player, brother of Mark and Karen Dalton
- Brett Dalton (born 1982), American actor
- Britain Dalton (born 2001), American actor
- Cal Dalton (1908–1974), American cartoon director
- Charles Dalton (1850-1933), Canadian businessman, politician and philanthropist on Prince Edward Island
- Chloe Dalton (born 1993), Australian rugby player
- Chloe Dalton (author), British writer
- Chuck Dalton (1927–2013), Canadian basketball player
- Clifford Dalton, New Zealand nuclear scientist
- Conrad Dalton, fictional president of the United States in Madam Secretary
- Cornelius Neale Dalton (1842–1920), British civil servant and author
- Declan Dalton (born 1997), Irish hurler
- Devyn Dalton, American actress and stuntwoman
- Diarmuid Dalton, Irish musician and songwriter
- Dorothy Dalton (1893–1972), American actress
- Drew Dalton, American philosopher
- Edward Tuite Dalton (1815 - 1880) British soldier, anthropologist
- Emmett Dalton (1861–1937), U.S. outlaw, member of the Dalton Gang
- Emmet Dalton (1898–1978), Irish soldier and film producer
- Eric Dalton (1906–1981), South African cricketer
- Festus Dalton, ring name of Drew Hankinson (born 1983), American professional wrestler
- Grady W. Dalton (died 1986), American politician from Virginia
- Harry Dalton (1928–2005), American baseball executive
- Hayden Dalton (born 1996), American basketball player for Hapoel Holon of the Israeli Basketball Premier League
- Henry Dalton (1847–1911), American physician
- Henry Dalton (police officer) (1891–1966), British policeman
- Howard Dalton, British microbiologist
- Hugh Dalton, Baron Dalton (1887–1962), British politician

== I–L ==
- Irene Dalton (1901–1934), American actress
- J. Frank Dalton (1848–1951), American alleged outlaw
- Jalen Dalton (born 1997), American football player
- James Dalton (disambiguation), several people, including:
  - James Dalton (criminal) (died 1730), British street robber
  - James Dalton II, a United States Army general killed in the Philippines during World War II
  - James Langley Dalton (1833–1887), English soldier
  - James Dalton (footballer) (1864–?), Irish footballer
  - James Dalton (pastoralist) (1834–1919), Irish born pastoralist in Australia
  - J. J. Dalton (James Joseph Dalton, 1861–1924), Irish nationalist Member of Parliament
- Jesse Dalton, ring name of Ray Gordy (born 1979), American professional wrestler
- John Dalton (disambiguation), several people, including:
  - John Dalton (1766–1844), British physicist and chemist
  - John Dalton (musician) (born 1943), British bass guitarist
  - John Call Dalton (1825–1889), American physiologist
  - John Howard Dalton (born 1941), American administrator and banker
  - John M. Dalton (1900–1972), American politician (Missouri)
  - John N. Dalton (1931–1986), American politician (Virginia)
  - John Neale Dalton (1839–1931), British cleric
  - John Dalton (bishop) (1821-1869) Irish-born Friar Minor
  - John Dalton (divine)(1814–1874), Catholic divine and translator from Latin, Spanish, and German
  - John Dalton (priest) Anglican priest in Ireland
  - John Dalton (poet) (1709–1763), English cleric and poet
  - John Dalton (hurler) (born 1985), Irish hurler
  - John Dalton (architect) (1927–2007), Australian architect
  - John Dalton (musician) (born 1943), former member of the Kinks
  - John G. Dalton(1876–1923), Australian footballer for Fitzroy
- Jon Dalton (born 1974) U.S. wrestler ("Jonny Fairplay")
- Joseph Dalton (disambiguation), several people, including:
  - Joseph Dalton (footballer) (1915–?), English professional footballer
  - Joseph Dalton (priest) (1817–1905), Irish Jesuit
- Karen Dalton (basketball), (born 1961), Australian basketball player, sister of Brad and Mark Dalton
- Karen Dalton (entertainer) (1938–1993), American musician
- Katharina Dalton (1916–2004), British physician
- Kerry Lyn Dalton (born 1960), American convicted criminal
- Kristen Dalton (actress) (born 1966), American actress
- Kristen Dalton (Miss USA) (born 1986), Miss USA 2009
- Lacy J. Dalton (born 1948), American singer and songwriter
- Lawrence Dalton (died 1561), English officer of arms
- Lional Dalton (born 1975), American football player
- Louis Joseph Dalton (20 September 1862 – 13 January 1945) was an Irish Cumann na nGaedheal politician.
- Lucinda Lee Dalton (1847–1925), American Mormon feminist, poet and suffragist

== M–Z ==
- Mark Dalton (basketball), Australian basketball player, brother of Brad and Karen Dalton
- Matthew Dalton (born 1998), Irish rugby union player
- Matt Jimmy Dalton (1963–2016, English rugby league footballer, Whitehaven R.L.F.C. immortal
- Michael Dalton (disambiguation), several people, including:
  - Michael Dalton (legal writer) (1564–1644), English barrister
  - Michael Dalton (gambler) (born 1955), gambling author, publisher and blackjack player
  - Michael Dalton (footballer) (1875–1933), Australian rules footballer
  - Michael Dalton (priest) (1902–2009), Canadian Roman Catholic military chaplain in World War II
- Nathan Dalton, American Baseball player
- Nigel Dalton, Australian politician
- Oakley Dalton (born 1952), American football player
- Phyllis Dalton (1925–2025), English costume designer
- Ray Dalton (born 1990), American singer, best known for his role on Can't Hold Us
- Reg Dalton (1896–1979), English footballer
- Richard Dalton (disambiguation), several people
- Rick Dalton, fictional actor played by Leonardo DiCaprio in Once Upon a Time in Hollywood
- Roque Dalton (1935–1975), Salvadoran poet and journalist
- Shane Dalton (born 1965), Irish Dublin GAA Inter County hurler and footballer
- Stephen Dalton, British air marshal
- Theodore Roosevelt Dalton (1901–1989) American lawyer, judge and politician
- Thomas Dalton (disambiguation), several people, including:
  - Thomas de Kirkcudbright, (before 1294–1326) also known as Thomas de Dalton, medieval prelate from the Kingdom of Scotland
  - Thomas Dalton (abolitionist), (1794–1883), African American abolitionist
  - Thomas Dalton (Australian politician), (1829–1901), Irish-born Australian politician
  - Tom Dalton,(1904–1981), Australian politician and member of the New South Wales Legislative Assembly
  - Thomas Dalton (merchant), (1516/17–1591), English merchant, landowner, and Member of Parliament
  - Thomas Dalton (judge),(before 1702–1730), English judge and Chief Baron of the Irish Exchequer
- Tim Dalton, Irish footballer
- Timmy Dalton, (born 1959) Irish retired Gaelic footballer
- Timothy Dalton (born 1946), British actor
- Tony Dalton (born 1975), Mexican actor
- Trent Dalton, Australian journalist and author
- Tristram Dalton (1738–1817), American politician
- Walter Dalton (born 1949), American politician from North Carolina
- William Dalton (author) (1821–1875), British newspaper editor and author of adventure stories

== See also ==
- Dalton (disambiguation)
- Dalton (given name)
- Danton (name)
