= Michael Dalton =

Michael Dalton may refer to:

- Michael Dalton (legal writer) (1564–1644), English barrister
- Michael Dalton (gambler) (born 1955), gambling author, publisher and blackjack player
- Michael Dalton (footballer) (1875–1933), Australian rules footballer
- Michael Dalton (priest) (1902–2009), Canadian Roman Catholic military chaplain in World War II

== See also ==
- Mike Dalton (disambiguation)
