= John Dalton (disambiguation) =

John Dalton (1766–1844) was a scientist who pioneered modern atomic theory.

John Dalton may also refer to:

== Arts ==
- John Dalton (architect) (1927–2007), Australian architect
- John Dalton (musician) (born 1943), former member of the Kinks
- John Dalton (author), American author

== Politics and government ==
- John Dalton (MP) (1610–1679), English politician who sat in the House of Commons between 1659 and 1679
- John Call Dalton (1825–1889), American physiologist
- John M. Dalton (1900–1972), Governor of Missouri
- John N. Dalton (1931–1986), Governor of Virginia from 1978 to 1982
- John Howard Dalton (born 1941), US Secretary of the Navy
- John Dalton (soldier) (died 1981), British Army general and father of Richard Dalton

== Religion ==
- John Dalton (priest), Anglican priest in Ireland
- John Dalton (poet) (1709–1763), English cleric and poet
- John Dalton (divine) (1814–1874), Catholic divine and translator from Latin, Spanish, and German
- John Dalton (bishop) (c. 1821–1869), Roman Catholic bishop
- John Neale Dalton (1839–1931), Anglican clergyman, Royal chaplain and tutor

== Sports ==
- John G. Dalton (1876–1923), Australian footballer for Fitzroy
- John Dalton (American football) (1889–1919), American football player for Navy
- John Dalton (hurler) (born 1985), Irish hurler
- John Dalton (footballer, born 2007), Australian footballer for Hawthorn

== See also ==
- Jon Dalton (born 1974), former Survivor contestant
- John D'alton (disambiguation)
- Jack Dalton (disambiguation)
