= James Dalton =

James Dalton may refer to:

- James Dalton (criminal) (died 1730), captain of a street robbery gang in 18th-century London, England
- James Dalton (footballer) (1864–?), Irish footballer
- James Dalton (MP for Saltash) (died 1601), MP for Saltash, Lostwithiel and Preston
- James Dalton (pastoralist) (1834–1919), pastoralist in Australia
- James Dalton (rugby union) (born 1972), South African rugby player
- James Dalton II (1910–1945), United States Army general killed in the Philippines during World War II
- James E. Dalton (1930–2024), United States Air Force general, Director of the Joint Staff
- J. J. Dalton (James Joseph Dalton, 1861–1924), Irish nationalist Member of Parliament
- James Langley Dalton (1833–1887), English soldier
- James T. Dalton (born 1963), American pharmacist
- James Dalton Highway, Alaska

== Characters ==
- James Dalton, portrayed by Patrick Swayze in the 1989 film Road House
- James Dalton, a fictional character in the Australian soap opera Home and Away played by Gyton Grantley
