= John Waller =

John Waller may refer to:

== Politicians ==
- John Waller (Virginia politician) (1673–1754), American politician in Virginia
- John Gough Waller, Australian politician
- John L. Waller (1850–1907), African-American lawyer, politician, journalist, publisher, businessman, military leader and diplomat
- John Waller (Wycombe MP), British Member of Parliament for Wycombe
- John Waller (County Limerick MP), Member of the UK Parliament County Limerick and Parliament of Ireland for Limerick County
- John Waller (Doneraile MP), Member of the Parliament of Ireland for Doneraile

== Others ==
- John Waller (perjurer) (died 1732), stoned to death in pillory
- John Francis Waller (1809–1894), Irish poet and editor
- Red Waller (1883–1915), Major League Baseball pitcher
- Sir John Waller, 7th Baronet (1917–1995), English author, poet and journalist
- John Waller (Baptist) (1741–1802), Virginia preacher (a/k/a "Swearing Jack" Waller), see Elijah Craig
- John Waller (bishop) (1924–2015), bishop of Stafford
- John Waller (musician) (born 1970), American Contemporary Christian musician and singer-songwriter
- John H. Waller (CIA official) (1923–2004), Inspector General of the Central Intelligence Agency
- John H. Waller (judge) (born 1937), South Carolina judge
- John Waller (cricketer) (1824–1886), English cricketer
- John Waller (fight director) (1940–2018), English historical European martial arts (HEMA) revival pioneer and fight director
