= Lily Alice Lefevre =

Canadian poet and lyricist (1854–1938)

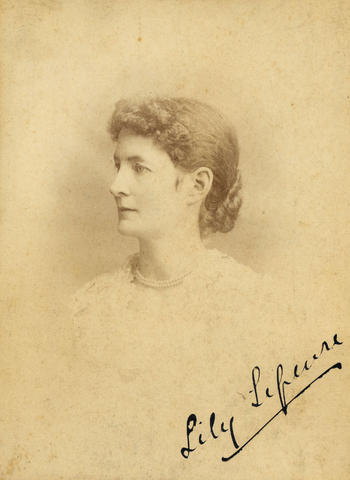
- Lily Alice Lefevre in 1890
- Born: Lily Alice Mary Cooke; 5 April 1854 Kingston, Canada West
- Died: 17 October 1938 (aged 84) Vancouver, British Columbia
- Genres: Poetry, lyrics

Lily Alice Lefevre (5 April 1854 – 17 October 1938) was a Canadian poet and lyricist. After a success in Montreal with her poem "The Spirit of the Carnival", she moved in 1886 to Vancouver. Her 1895 book of poems, The Lions' Gate and Other Verses, was the first literary work published by a woman in British Columbia. Lefevre's poetry appeared in Canadian and British magazines. She also wrote lyrics to songs, performed by singers such as Clara Butt and John McCormack. She published two volumes of verse and a limited edition album. Lefevre became a patron of the arts and was a co-founder of the Vancouver Art Gallery.

== Biography ==
Lily Alice Mary Cooke was born in Kingston, Ontario, on 5 April 1854. Her parents were Richard Cooke, an engineer, and Anna Plunkett. She was educated in Montreal. Writing under her pen name Fleurange, in 1875 she published the poem "Canada Wooed by the Seasons", in the Toronto magazine The Canadian Monthly and National Review. In 1879, her poem "Across the Gulf" came out in the same periodical. In 1883, she married John Lefevre, a doctor, in Brockville, Ontario. Two years later, she won the $100 prize offered by the Montreal Witness newspaper for the poem, "The Spirit of the Carnival". It was anthologized in William Douw Lighthall's 1889 survey of Canadian verse, Songs of the Great Dominion.

Lefevre arrived in Vancouver in 1886 after her husband was appointed surgeon of the western division of the Canadian Pacific Railway. She described the young city for the Montreal newspapers. In 1889, her poem The Lions' Gateway (later renamed The Lions' Gate) was printed in The Vancouver Daily World newspaper on New Year's Eve. Besides writing, Lefevre had some artistic ability as well, with proficiency in watercolours and charcoal. In 1890, her sketch of The Lions was reproduced in Frank Leslie's Popular Monthly. In 1894, one of her poems, "Requital", appeared in Canadian Magazine.

Her 1895 book, The Lions' Gate and Other Verses, was the first work of literature published by a woman in British Columbia. In its review, the British magazine The Spectator wrote that "the writer has a certain gift of writing vigorous verse", giving as an example an excerpt from "The Valley of Time". Robert Bringhurst remarked that the book was the earliest literary work in the province to have "any sense of the landscape," especially in regards to how the environment could be transformed, creating new wealth.

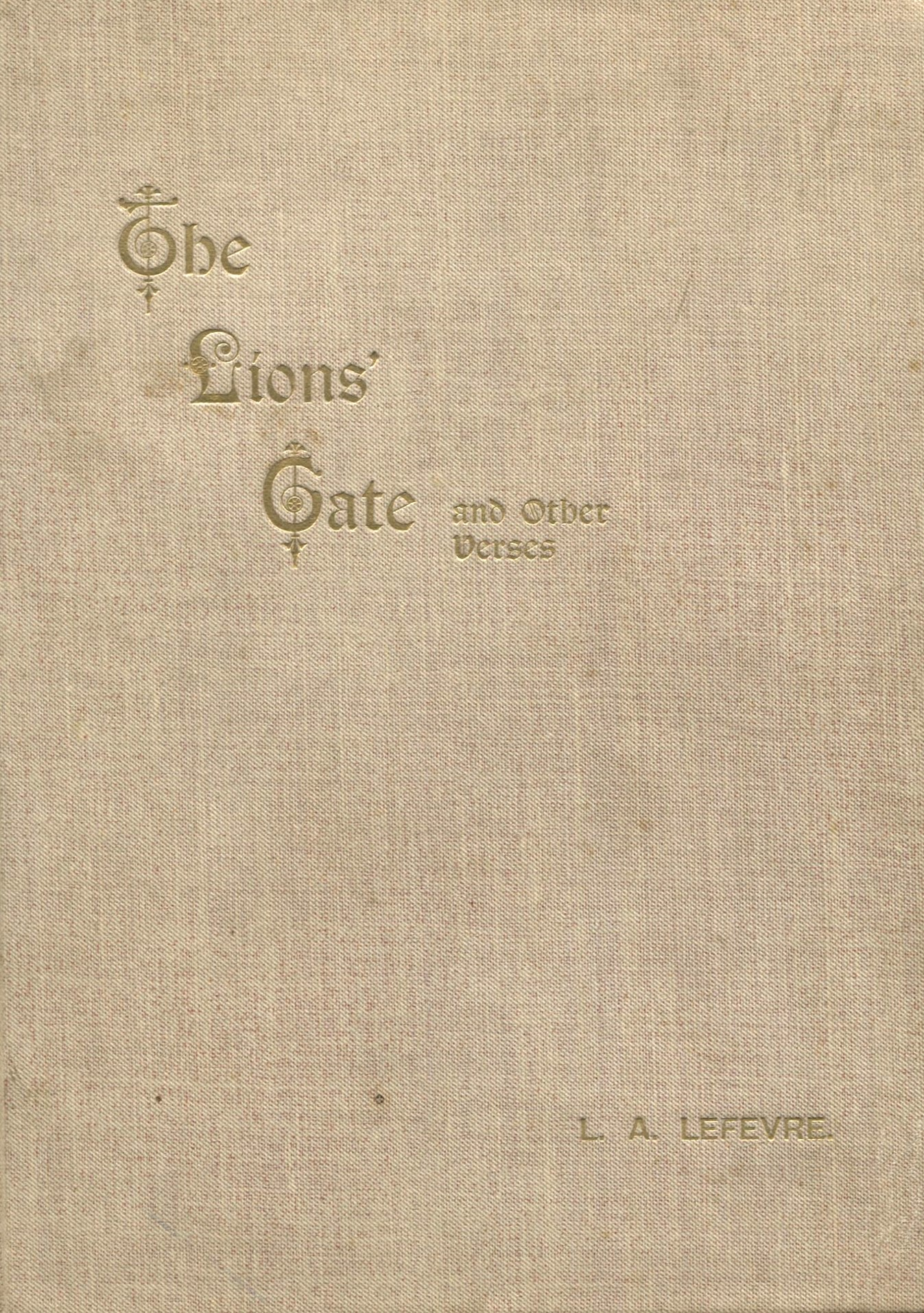
The Lions' Gate and Other Verses. Province Publishing, Victoria, 1895.

The title poem of her first book, "The Lions' Gate", as well as "The "Beaver" to the "Empress"", were published in 1903 in a beautiful limited edition album with accompanying photographs. In the following year, her poem "A Daughter's Voice" appeared in the British magazine the National Review. After her husband's death in 1906, Lefevre became a patron of the arts, and made her home, "Langaravine", on the cliffs of Point Grey, a gathering place for writers, artists, and scholars. Her circle included members of the Vancouver Poetry Society, the poets Annie Charlotte Dalton and E. J. Pratt, the teacher Pelham Edgar, and the editor of the Vancouver Sun, Robert Cromie. She was prominent in the Vancouver branch of the Canadian Authors Association. In 1909, the Victoria Colonist newspaper described her as a "polished writer of either prose or verse," and that Lord Dufferin included one of her sonnets in a compilation for his friends, alongside eminent English poets such as Tennyson and Browning.

Lefevre wrote lyrics set to music by composers. In 1897, her lyrics to "The Three Guides", composed by A. H. Behrend, were noted as being above the ordinary. In 1914, her patriotic song, "March on! Canada!" was performed by the singer Clara Butt and composer Harold Craxton in Victoria and Winnipeg. The song was additionally recorded by the Irish tenor John McCormack in New York. One of McCormack's favourite songs in his repertoire was "Mavis" written by Lefevre.

In 1921, Lefevre published her second book of poetry, A Garden By The Sea. She was a co-founder of the Vancouver Art Gallery, opened in 1931. Three years later, she donated $5,000 for a scholarship and gold medal to the University of British Columbia in honor of her husband. In 1936, The Lions' Gate was again reprinted during Vancouver's Jubilee celebrations. Lefevre died on 17 October 1938 at her home in Vancouver.

== Works ==
- The Lions' Gate and Other Verses (1895)
- The Lions' Gate and the "Beaver" to the "Empress" (1903)
- A Garden By The Sea and Other Poems (1921)

=== Anthologies ===
Works by Lefevre are included in these books:

- Songs of the Great Dominion (1889)
- Canadian Poems and Lays (1892)
- Treasury of Canadian Verse (1900)
- Canadian Verse for Boys and Girls (1930)
