= Mike Dalton =

Mike Dalton may refer to:

- Michael Dalton (priest) (1902–2009), Canadian military chaplain
- Mike Dalton (baseball) (born 1963), Major League Baseball pitcher with the Detroit Tigers
- Mike Dalton (wrestler), former ring name of Matt Clement, Canadian wrestler

== See also ==
- Michael Dalton (disambiguation)
