= John D'Alton (disambiguation) =

John D'Alton (1882–1963) was a Roman Catholic Cardinal and Archbishop of Armagh.

John D'alton may also refer to:

- John D'Alton (historian) (1792–1867), Irish lawyer and genealogist
- John D'Alton (engineer) (1829–1904), Australian engineer

== See also ==
- John Dalton (disambiguation)
