= Joseph Dalton =

Joseph or Joe Dalton may refer to:

- Joseph Dalton (footballer) (1915–?), English professional footballer
- Joseph Dalton (priest) (1817–1905), Irish Jesuit
- Joe Dalton (Lucky Luke), fictional character

== See also ==
- Joseph Dalton Hooker (1817–1911), British botanist and explorer
