= General Dalton =

General Dalton may refer to:

- Albert Clayton Dalton (1867–1957), U.S. Army brigadier general
- Emmet Dalton (1898–1978), British Army major general
- James E. Dalton (born 1930), U.S. Air Force general
