= Jack Dalton =

Jack Dalton may refer to:

== People ==
- Jack Dalton (explorer), explorer and cartographer of Tatshenshini River
- Jack Dalton (footballer, born 1876), Australian rules footballer for Fitzroy
- Jack Dalton (footballer, born 2007), Australian rules footballer for Hawthorn
- Jack Dalton, a ring name of professional wrestler Don Fargo (1930–2015)

== Fictional characters ==
- Jack Dalton (EastEnders), fictional character from EastEnders
- Jack Dalton (MacGyver), fictional character from MacGyver
- Jack Dalton, fictional character from Lucky Luke

== See also ==
- John Dalton (disambiguation)
