= Alexander Stephen =

Alexander Stephen may refer to:

- Alexander Stephen (rugby union) (1861–1942), Scotland international rugby union player
- Alexander Stephen Jr. (1845-1920), Canadian mayor
- Alexander Charles Stephen (1893–1966), Scottish zoologist and astronomer
- Alexander Condie Stephen (1850–1908), British diplomat and translator
- Alexander Maitland Stephen (1882–1942), Canadian author
- A. G. Stephen (1862–1924), chief manager of the Hongkong and Shanghai Banking Corporation
- Alexander Stephen and Sons, a Scottish shipbuilding company

== See also ==
- Alexander H. Stephens (1812–1883), American politician
- Alexander Hodgdon Stevens (1789–1869), American surgeon
