= Emergency Fleet Corporation =

Shipping fleet established by the United States Shipping Board

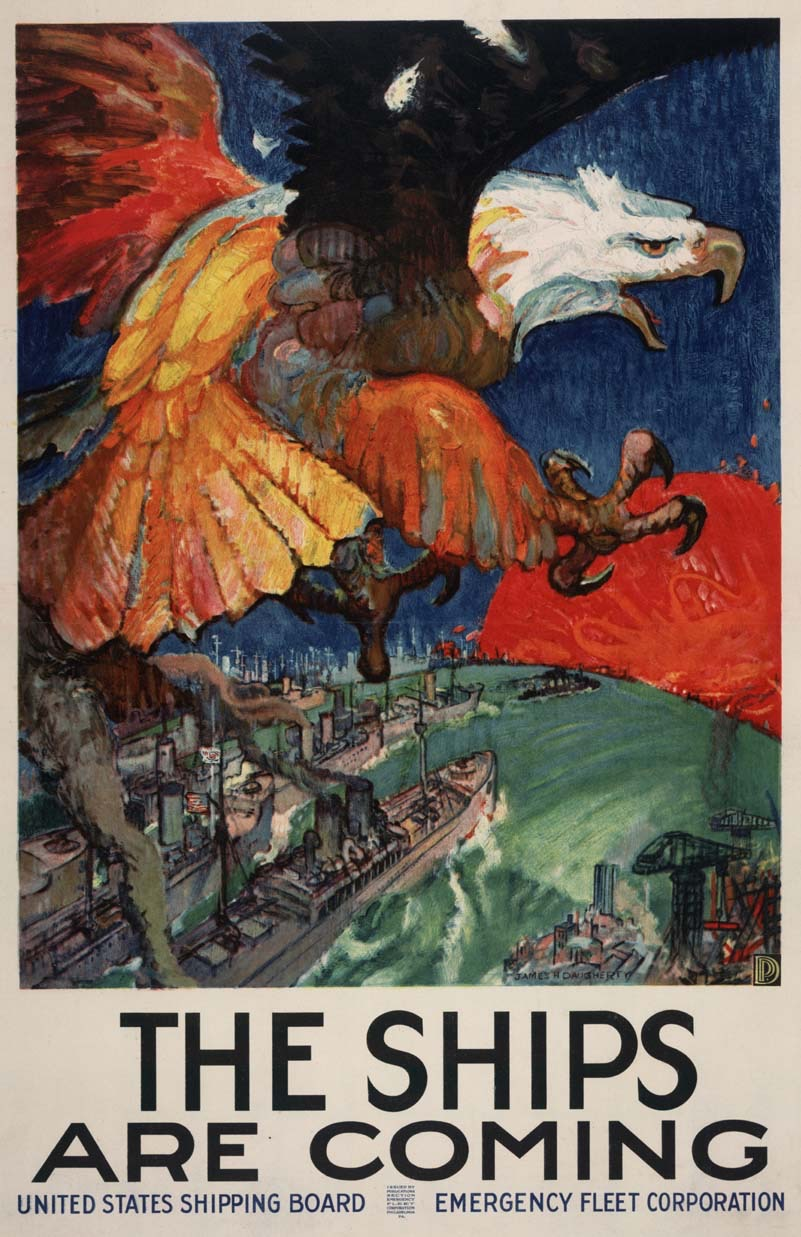
A World War I poster for the US Shipping Board, ca. 1917–18.

The Emergency Fleet Corporation (EFC) was established by the United States Shipping Board, sometimes referred to as the War Shipping Board, on 16 April 1917 pursuant to the Shipping Act (39 Stat. 729) to acquire, maintain, and operate merchant ships to meet national defense, foreign and domestic commerce during World War I.

The Shipping Board had been established while the United States was at peace, with the intent to restore the nation's Merchant Marine. That changed with war. In the words of Edward N. Hurley, Chairman of the Board:

When the United States declared war against Germany the whole purpose and policy of the Shipping Board and the Fleet Corporation suffered a radical change overnight. From a body established to restore the American Merchant Marine to its old glory, the Shipping Board was transformed into a military agency to bridge the ocean with ships and to maintain the line of communication between America and Europe. Conceived as an instrumentality of peace, the Board became an instrumentality of war. Unlike other military agencies—the Army and Navy—it began with nothing—no ships, no officers, no crews, no organizations.

Ten days after the declaration of war the Emergency Fleet Corporation was established in response to those wartime requirements.

The EFC was renamed the U.S. Shipping Board Merchant Fleet Corporation in February 1927, then abolished entirely in October 1936. Its functions were transferred to the United States Maritime Commission.

== Origin ==
On 2 April 1917 President Woodrow Wilson cited Germany's refusal to suspend unrestricted submarine warfare in the North Atlantic and the Mediterranean in his request for a declaration of war on Germany, and Congress concurred on 2 April 1917. In that April 1,250,000 deadweight tons were sunk, with 122 ocean-going ships sunk in the first two weeks after that declaration of war. British losses in that period equaled an average round-trip voyage loss of 25%. Allied losses before U.S. entry had already been that heavy that yards outside the U.S. struggled to replace losses in a timely manner.

Congress had rejected previous attempts to create a shipping board to manage U.S. maritime affairs, beginning with bills introduced on 4 September 1914. President Wilson repeatedly requested enactment of a shipping act until Representative Joshua W. Alexander introduced House Bill 15455 that became law as the Shipping Act of 1916 (39 Stat. L. 728). That act established the United States Shipping Board headed by five commissioners appointed by the President and confirmed by the Senate. That board had complete control over American ships and shipping. Most importantly with respect to the Emergency Fleet Corporation was its power to form corporations for acquiring, maintaining and operating merchant vessels under certain conditions. Ten days after declaration of war, on 16 April 1917, the Board created the Emergency Fleet Corporation (EFC) in the District of Columbia with a capital stock of $50,000,000.

== Implementation ==
As peacetime legislation, the Shipping Act did not fully anticipate wartime conditions. On 11 July 1917 the President by Executive Order delegated to the EFC all his wartime power and authority to acquire existing vessels and to construct and operate all vessels acquired or to be acquired by the United States. The EFC operated largely under these powers rather than the basic peacetime act for the duration of the war. While the Act had envisioned the corporations with the United States as simply the majority stockholder, the wartime reality was that it was the sole stockholder. Legally the EFC could not actually operate the ships unless no private companies could be found to do so. In reality wartime conditions made tighter government control imperative. As a corporation, even with total government ownership, the EFC did not have the powers of the Board, thus the Shipping Board usually assumed and then transferred ships and facilities to the EFC which was subject to federal and state laws governing corporations.

=== Early controversy ===
A fundamental flaw led to early controversy. The Chairman of the United States Shipping Board, William Denman (a lawyer and campaign contributor to Woodrow Wilson), was also head of the EFC with only nominal powers over the EFC with the critical exception of the power to sign contracts. The EFC General Manager, General George Washington Goethals, had all other effective powers without that one crucial power necessary to implement the Corporation's policies. Popular conception of what became the Denman-Goethals controversy involved William Denman's support of wooden ship construction and General Goethals' opposition. That Goethals could not sign contracts while expected to build ships and Denman as President of the Fleet Corporation who could sign contracts had no control over the actual operation of the EFC resulted in the highly public resignation of both men. After the war, the wooden ship program in particular resulted in a large number of hulls with no useful purpose that were then a disposal problem. In retrospect some considered this entire effort a waste. The impractical plan to mass-produce a thousand small wooden steamers was developed by the lawyer William Denman and an amateur yachtsman from Massachusetts (Frederic A. Eustis). Both men convinced Woodrow Wilson of this scheme, and claimed the famous engineer General George Washington Goethals agreed to assist them, the White House announced to the press that Goethals would take the job (without his knowledge). Goethals reluctantly agreed —because his quick resignation would lead to a public relations disaster for the president—, but he soon realized that the plan for building wooden ships was flawed (they were small, slow and could not efficiently be mass-produced). Goethals encouraged ship builders to look into the mass production of steel vessels by fabricating standardized parts across the country, a plan that would eventually be adopted.

=== Reconstitution of the Board ===
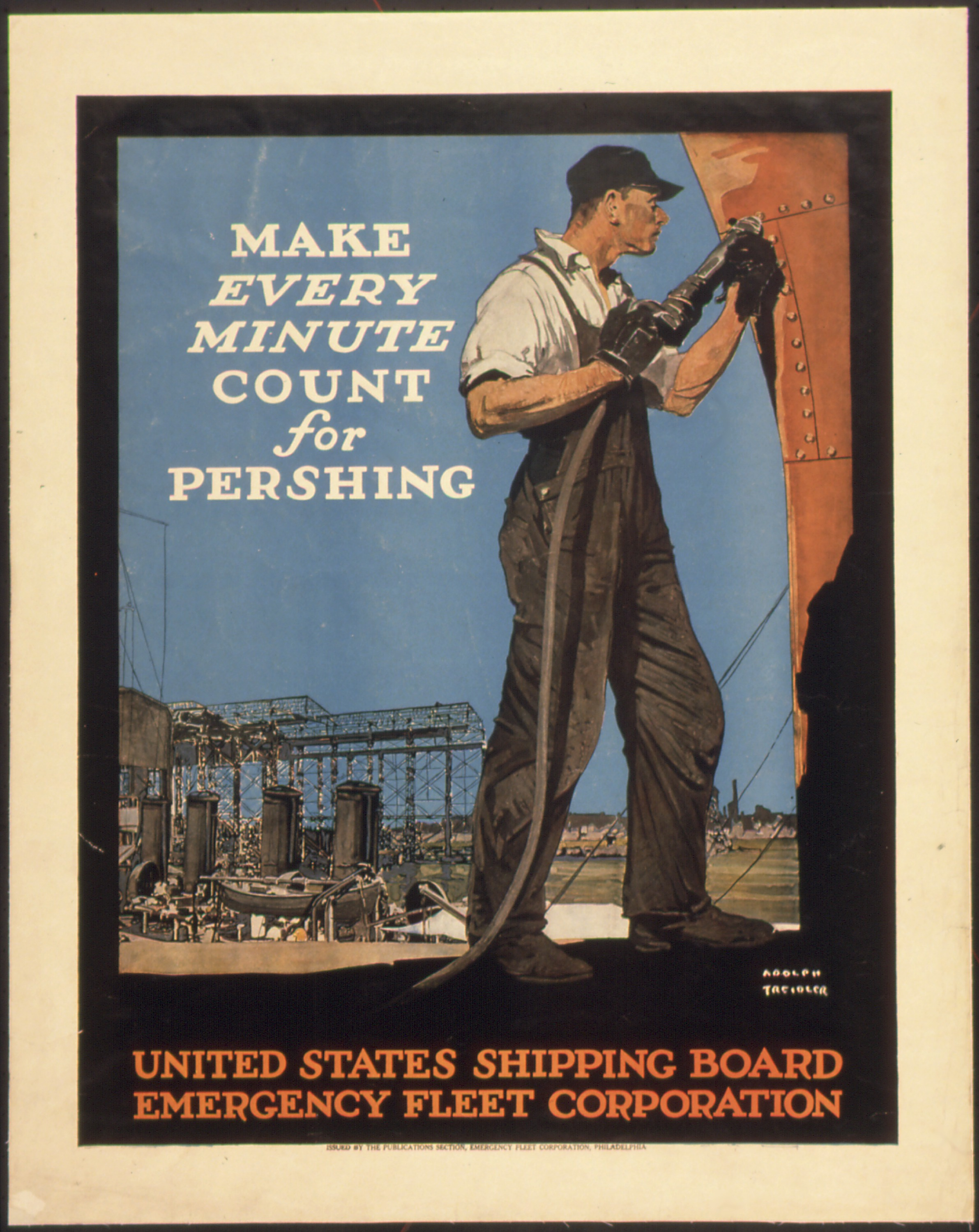
"Make Every Minute Count For Pershing", United States Shipping Board Emergency Fleet Corporation, ca. 1917–1919

The President accepted the resignations of both Denman and Goethals and appointed Edward N. Hurley Chairman of the Shipping Board 27 July 1917. Rear Admiral Washington L. Capps replaced Goethals as General Manager of the EFC. Capps resigned due to ill health and was succeeded for two weeks by Rear-Admiral Frederic R. Harris who resigned over an issue of authority. EFC's Vice-President, Charles Piez then established stability by recommending that the General Manager post be abolished and that Charles M. Schwab be appointed in the new post of Director General. Schwab was thus able to give total attention to EFC matters, whereas Piez had held both posts of Vice-President and General Manager.

== Actions ==
On entry into the war there were fewer than 50,000 shipyard workers in U.S. yards and production could not possibly meet wartime demands and attrition. Under the delegated Presidential authority the Shipping Board, through Admiral Capps, General Manager of the Fleet Corporation, requisitioned the shipyards and all steel ships over 2500 deadweight tons then under construction. A primary goal was to focus shipyard work on U.S. requirements rather than commercial needs of neutral and even Allied customers. Another goal was to standardize production. The shipyards protested without success. As many of the 431 ships involved were only contracts or still under construction the EFC assumed responsibility for their completion. There were international consequences, one being the fact that Great Britain had a large number of those ships also planned for war service. In the end the ships were requisitioned and the British were satisfied that they would be used in the war effort.

Ships of enemy states interned in the U.S. were seized and some overseas were acquired. U.S. ships in service were then commandeered with their owners becoming operators for the EFC. Even Great Lakes shipping was pressed into oceanic service.

With available ships and yards commandeered the EFC began its expansion of shipbuilding capacity. The early concept of managing the building of ships in existing yards was quickly shown to be inadequate as they were completing the hulls commandeered as contracted or in progress or with Navy orders. Entirely new shipyards had to be established with the EFC as sponsor. Four government-financed yards accounted for 25% of the new steel fabricated ships built with 94 ways.

- Bristol yard: Merchant Shipbuilding Corporation (Note: See Shipbuilding History, Merchant Shipbuilding Corp., Chester PA)
- Hog Island: American International Shipbuilding Corporation. (Note: "Hog Island Shipyard, Philadelphia PA". American International Shipbuilding Corp., Philadelphia PA. Archived from the original on December 17, 2009. Now the site of Philadelphia International Airport and the home of the notable "Hog Islander" ships.) The Hog Island project was subject of some controversy but ended up being a prototype for mass-produced ships that was capable of handling up to 78 ships at a time on the ways or fitting out.
- Newark: Submarine Boat Corporation
- Wilmington-Carolina Shipbuilding Company: This was a minor yard in World War I and apparently not directly the predecessor of the North Carolina Shipbuilding Company prominent in World War II. In testimony Mr. Piez noted: "The Carolina Shipbuilding Company is constructing a yard with four ways at Wilmington, N.C. Our agents there are the Carolina Shipbuilding Company, which in reality is the Fuller Construction Company of New York, who are large builders."

In full operation these yards had more annual tonnage capacity than found in any country before 1918.

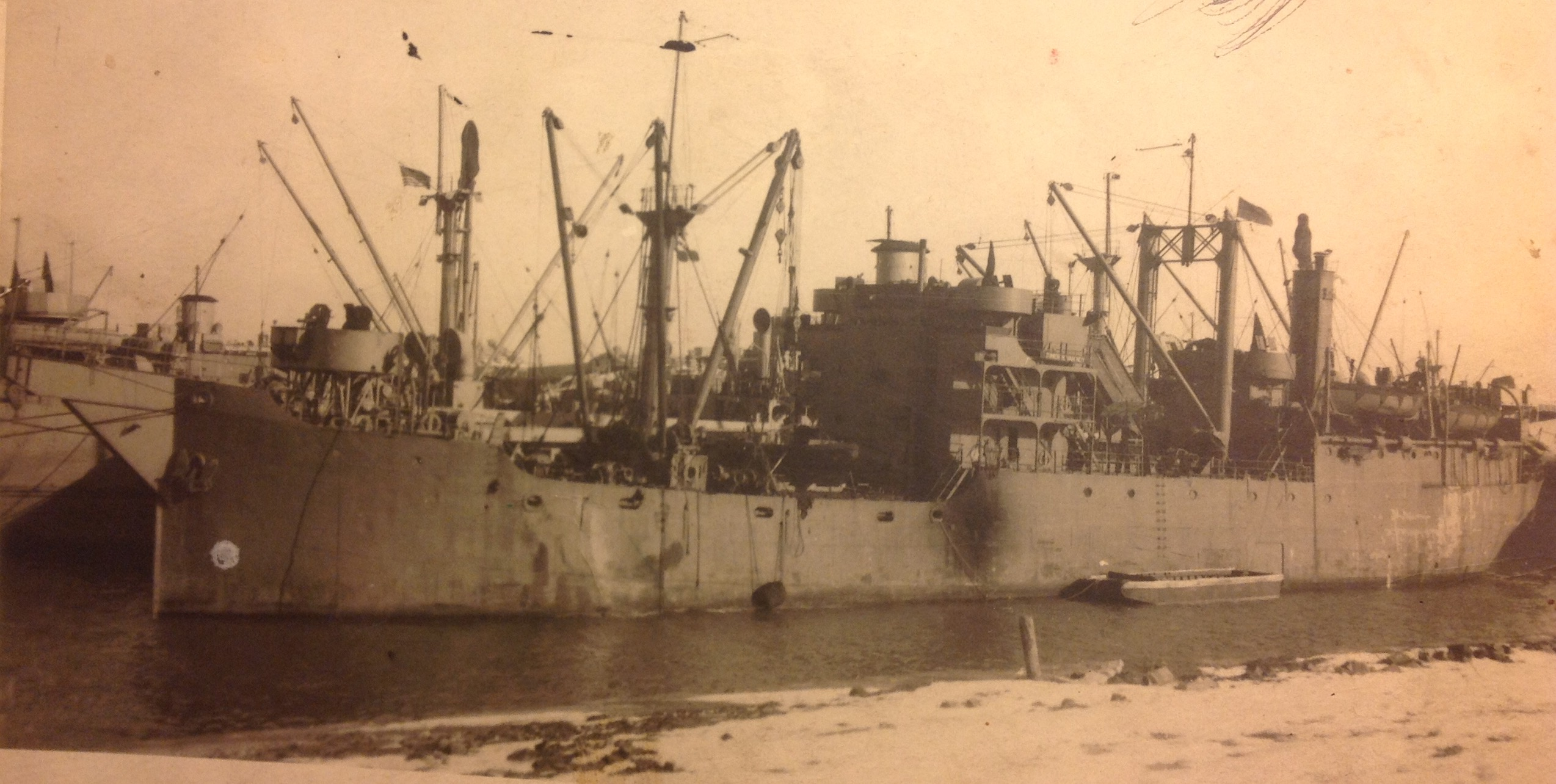
"Covena" later "Junior N. Van Noy".

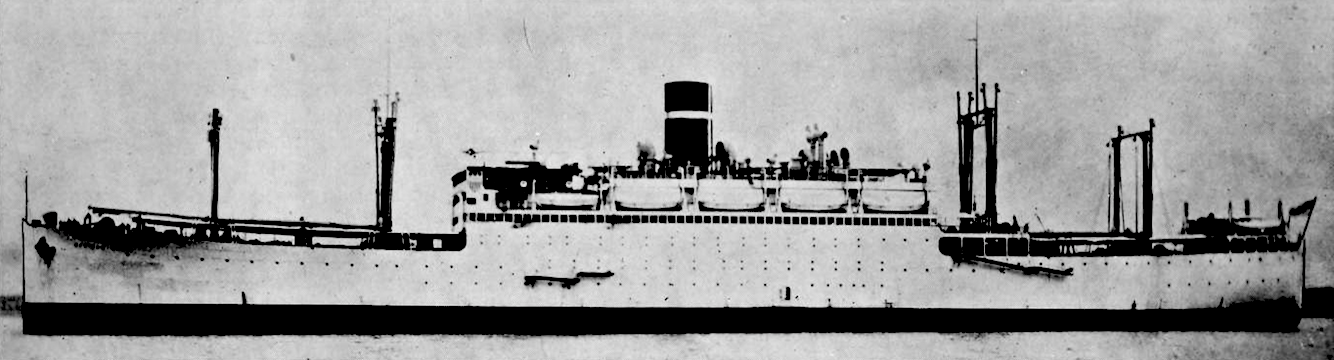
Western World in 1922

The shipbuilding program was concluded with the 9 May 1922 delivery of the ship completed and delivered as Western World, launched as Nutmeg State 17 September 1921, by Bethlehem Shipbuilding Corporation at Sparrows Point, Maryland.

Ships built under the EFC were common in commerce after the war even while many were laid up. Twenty years later in the crisis of shipping before the U.S. began wartime production, to some extent using the USSB/EFC model again, the British need for hulls brought many of the old laid up ships then under Maritime Commission control into that war.

== Controversies ==
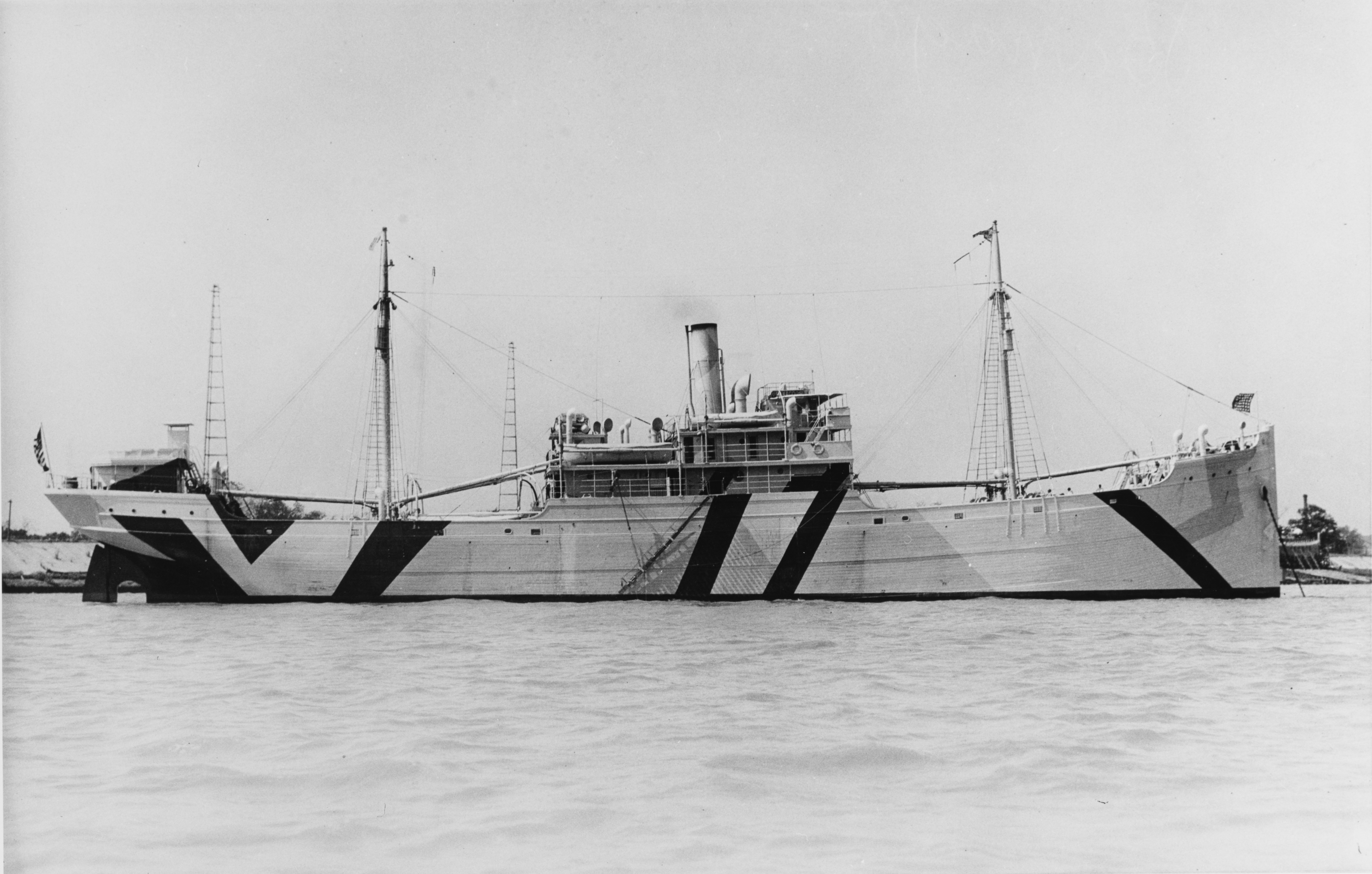
Emergency Fleet Corporation Design 1001, Ferris type, photo of the USS Banago (ID # 3810).

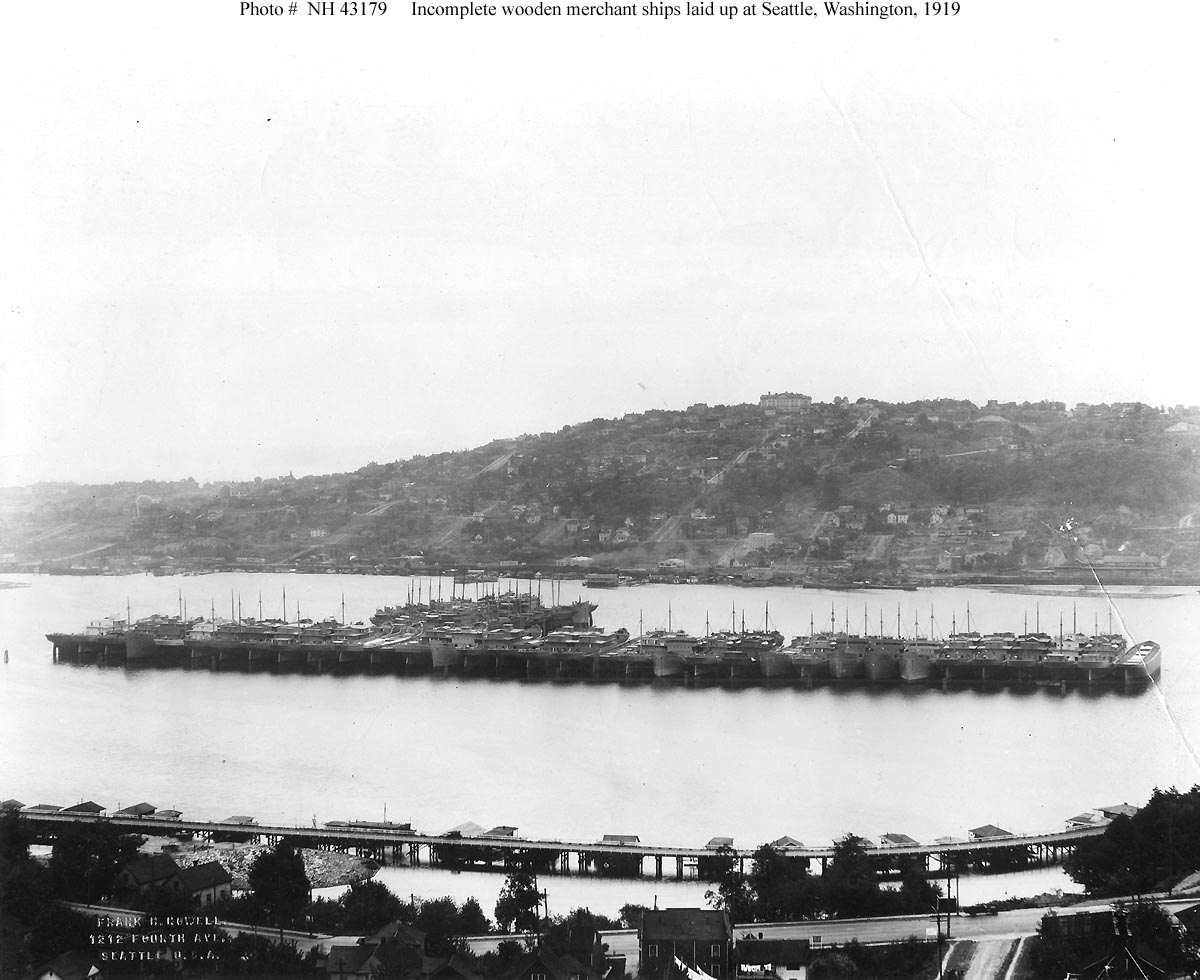
Incomplete merchant ships laid up at Seattle, Washington, circa early to mid-1919, probably the storage facility at Seattle used by the Northern Pacific Division of the Emergency Fleet Corporation for wooden cargo ships it accepted without engines after the World War I Armistice. Naval History & Heritage Command, Online Library of Selected Images, Photo #: NH 43179.

The EFC was a subject of controversy. The armistice took effect before the yards, Hog Island being by far the largest and most publicized, reached full production and the expense was very large. The wooden ship program in particular resulted in a large number of hulls with no useful purpose that were then a disposal problem. Gearing up for wartime production produced a glut of ships and a market problem with peace. In retrospect some considered the entire effort waste. There were allegations of fraud, with one involving charges and civil suits against Charles W. Morse.

The USSB and EFC are used by both those of the opinion government is too close to industry in collaboration for war projects and those with the view government should stay out of such matters and a source of waste even in national emergency.

=== Controversial wooden ships ===
A notable, possibly notorious, project was the wooden, ocean-going steamer. William Denman had been an early proponent of these ships, as the nation had abundant lumber supplies, and there was doubt whether domestic steel production could cope with the demands of shipbuilding in conjunction with other wartime pressures. Both British and U.S. officials considered the ships worthwhile if the ships could make a single, successful one-way voyage to the war. Still, the wooden ship program was so controversial that Edward N. Hurley, Chairman United States Shipping Board, had to defend them in a public speech at the Commodore Hotel in March 1919, then in 1927 in his book "The Bridge to France", within a chapter titled "Wood Ships Were Necessary": "I am convinced that we were amply justified in building the wood ships, although no one wished to assume the responsibility for them because of the criticism and ridicule which they had received."

Some of the several designs are commonly named Ferris designs after Theodore E. Ferris, the official naval architect for the USSB. Ferris designed both steel and wood ships for mass production. The most numerous wooden Ferris type was Design 1001, a wooden 3,500-ton steam freighter with dimensions of approximately 281 X 46 X 23.5 feet (7.2 m) built largely of precut, numbered components of pine or Douglas fir.

There were other wooden ship designs, many unique to regional yards, and a large wooden fleet was built, one that has been called by some the "white elephant" fleet. Some were burned in accidents; however others were burned after the war to recover valuable metals. For example, in 1922 Western Marine and Salvage Company (WM&SC) of Alexandria, Virginia bought 233 such ships for $750,000 so that the ships could have machinery removed in Alexandria and then towed back to the anchorage on the Potomac and burned to regain remaining scrap. That activity brought protests from watermen and the operation was moved in 1924 to 566 acres (2.29 km^{2}) of company owned farmland surrounding Mallows Bay in Maryland.

== Disposition ==
The EFC was renamed the U.S. Shipping Board Merchant Fleet Corporation by act of Congress 11 February 1927 (44 Stat. 1083). One early president was the former Army officer Albert Clayton Dalton.

The Board and Corporation were subsequently abolished on 26 October 1936, and their functions transferred to the U.S. Maritime Commission by the Merchant Marine Act (49 Stat. 1985) of 29 June 1936.

== See also ==
- Dundalk Historic District
- Riverside Apartments
- Federal Maritime Commission
- Mallows Bay–Potomac River National Marine Sanctuary
- United States Maritime Administration

== Notes ==
- 397 wooden Ferris hulls were partially or fully finished of the thousand hull order by the November 1918 Armistice.

== Sources ==
- The Bridge To France by Edward N. Hurley, Wartime Chairman of the U. S. Shipping Board
- National Archives: Records of the United States Maritime Commission
