= Sabizabulin =

Chemical compound

Clinical data
- Other names: VERU-111

Identifiers
- IUPAC name: [2-(1H-indol-3-yl)-1H-imidazol-5-yl]-(3,4,5-trimethoxyphenyl)methanone
- CAS Number: 1332881-26-1
- PubChem CID: 53379371
- ChemSpider: 28642581
- UNII: 37L1JX37J5
- KEGG: D12519
- ChEMBL: ChEMBL2163631

Chemical and physical data
- Formula: C_{21}H_{19}N_{3}O_{4}
- Molar mass: 377.400 g·mol^{−1}
- 3D model (JSmol): Interactive image
- SMILES: COC1=CC(=CC(=C1OC)OC)C(=O)C2=CN=C(N2)C3=CNC4=CC=CC=C43
- InChI: InChI=1S/C21H19N3O4/c1-26-17-8-12(9-18(27-2)20(17)28-3)19(25)16-11-23-21(24-16)14-10-22-15-7-5-4-6-13(14)15/h4-11,22H,1-3H3,(H,23,24); Key:WQGVHOVEXMOLOK-UHFFFAOYSA-N

Sabizabulin is an investigational new drug that is being evaluated for the treatment of castration-resistant prostate cancer and in SARS-CoV-2 (COVID-19) infections. It is a tubulin polymerization inhibitor.

Sabizabulin is chemical compound from the group of indole and imidazole derivatives that was first reported in 2012 by Dalton, Li, and Miller. A new synthesis method has recently been published, using 3,4,5-trimethoxybenzoic acid and indole-3-carboxylic acid as starting materials.

== Pharmacology ==
=== Pharmacokinetics ===
Sabizabulin is not a substrate of P-glycoprotein (Pgp), an efflux pump that, when overexpressed, can confer resistance to taxanes, a group of widely used cancer therapeutics.

=== Mechanism of action ===
Sabizabulin, as an orally available molecule, acts on microtubules, a component of the cytoskeleton. It binds to the colchicine binding site on the beta subunit of tubulin, as well as a novel site on the alpha subunit, and causes both to crosslink, thus depolymerizing microtubules and preventing their polymerization. By preventing mitotic spindle formation, this directly inhibits mitosis of tumor cells and endothelial cells attempting to form new blood vessels to feed them. In parallel, microtubule-mediated trafficking of cellular components (including androgen receptors into the nucleus), thus, a potential anti-androgen agent. The transport of viral particles (including SARS-CoV-2) may also be inhibited. These activities can inhibit viral replication and assembly. Inhibition of tubulin polymerization can also inhibit the release of pro-inflammatory cytokines and disrupt the activities of inflammatory cells.

== Research ==
=== COVID-19 therapy ===
In a phase III study on the treatment of severe courses of COVID-19, sabizabulin reduced mortality by 55% according to the manufacturer. Because of the high efficacy, the test phase was stopped prematurely so that the drug no longer had to be withheld from the placebo control group.
