= Riverside Apartments =

- U.S. National Register of Historic Places
- Virginia Landmarks Register
- Location within Virginia Location within the United States
- Location: 4500-4600 Washington Ave., Newport News, Virginia
- Coordinates: 36°59′28″N 76°26′20″W
- Area: 1.5 acres (0.61 ha)
- Built: 1918
- Built by: James Stewart & Company
- Architect: Joannes, Francis Y.
- NRHP reference No.: 83003294
- VLR No.: 121-0039

Significant dates
- Added to NRHP: July 28, 1983
- Designated VLR: January 18, 1983

Riverside Apartments, also known as Shipyard Apartments, is a historic apartment complex located at Newport News, Virginia. It was built in 1918, and consists of two, four-story, U-shaped brick apartment buildings decorated with simple bands of sandstone. The buildings features some classically derived decoration around the portals and a few accents of the same type on the parapets. They were built for the United States Shipping Board Emergency Fleet Corporation to alleviate the housing shortage created by an influx of workers into the Newport News Shipyards during World War I. Two of the four original buildings were destroyed, one in 1975 and the other in 1979.

It was listed on the National Register of Historic Places in 1983.
