= Karl Josef von Hefele =

German Catholic bishop and theologian (1809–1893)

- Bishop of Rottenburg
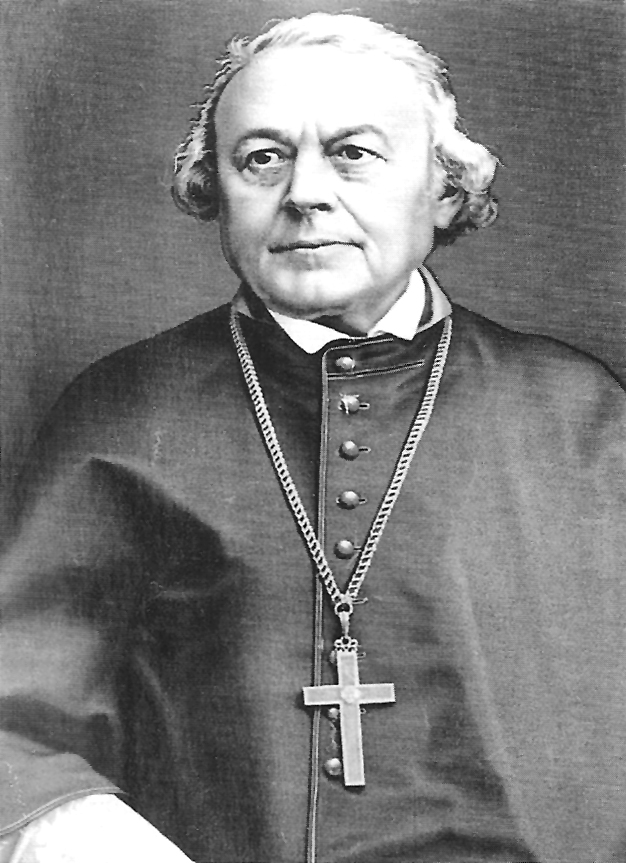
- Karl Josef von Hefele (1869)
- Church: Catholic Church
- Diocese: Diocese of Rottenburg
- In office: 22 November 1869 – 6 June 1893
- Predecessor: Josef von Lipp
- Successor: Wilhelm von Reiser

Orders
- Ordination: 14 August 1833
- Consecration: 29 December 1869 by Lothar von Kübel

Personal details
- Born: 15 March 1809 Unterkochen, Aalen, Kingdom of Württemberg, Rhine Confederation, French Empire
- Died: 6 June 1893 (aged 84) Rottenburg am Neckar, Kingdom of Württemberg, German Empire

Karl Josef von Hefele (March 15, 1809 – June 6, 1893) was a Roman Catholic bishop and theologian of Germany.

== Biography ==
Hefele was born at Unterkochen in Württemberg and was educated at Tübingen, where in 1839 he became professor-ordinary of Church history and patristics in the Roman Catholic faculty of theology, while collaborating along with William Robinson Clark to his major work.

From 1842 to 1845 he sat in the National Assembly of Württemberg. In December 1869 he was enthroned bishop of Rottenburg. His literary activity, which had been considerable, was in no way diminished by his elevation to the episcopate. Among his numerous theological works may be mentioned his well-known edition of the Apostolic Fathers, issued in 1839; his Life of Cardinal Ximenes, published in 1844 as Der Cardinal Ximenes und der kirchlichen Zustände Spaniens am Ende des 15. und am Anfange des 16. Jahrhunderts (Eng. trans. by John Dalton, 1860); and his still more celebrated Conciliengeschichte (History of the Councils of the Church), in seven volumes, which appeared between 1855 and 1874 (Eng. trans., 1871, 1882).

Hefele's theological opinions inclined towards the more liberal school in the Roman Catholic Church, but he nevertheless received considerable signs of favour from its authorities, and was a member of the commission that made preparations for the Vatican Council of 1870. On the eve of that council he published at Naples his Causa Honorii Papae, which aimed at demonstrating the moral and historical impossibility of papal infallibility. About the same time he brought out a work in German on the same subject. He took rather a prominent part in the discussions at the council, associating himself with Félix Dupanloup and with Georges Darboy, archbishop of Paris, in his opposition to the doctrine of Infallibility, and supporting their arguments from his vast knowledge of ecclesiastical history. In the preliminary discussions he voted against the promulgation of the dogma. He was absent from the important sitting of June 18, 1870, and did not send in his submission to the decrees until 1871, when he explained in a pastoral letter that the dogma "referred only to doctrine given forth ex cathedra, and therein to the definitions proper only, but not to its proofs or explanations".

In 1872 he took part in the congress summoned by the Ultramontanes at Fulda, and by his judicious use of minimizing tactics he kept his diocese free from any participation in the Old Catholic schism. The last four volumes of the second edition of his History of the Councils have been described as skillfully adapted to the new situation created by the Vatican decrees. During the later years of his life he undertook no further literary efforts on behalf of his church, but retired into relative privacy.

Hefele died in Rottenburg am Neckar.

== Selected works ==
- Karl Joseph von Hefele (1871). A History of the Councils of the Church: To the close of the Council of Nicea, A.D. 325. T. & T. Clark.
- Karl Joseph von Hefele (1876). A History of the Councils of the Church: A.D. 326 to A.D. 429. T. & T. Clark. ISBN 9780404032609.
- Karl Joseph von Hefele (1883). A History of the Councils of the Church: A.D. 431 to A.D. 451. T. & T. Clark.
- Karl Joseph von Hefele (1895). A History of the Councils of the Church, from the Original Documents. A.D. 451 to A.D. 680. T. & T. Clark. ISBN 9780404032609.
- Karl Joseph von Hefele (1896). A History of the Councils of the Church, from the Original Documents. A.D. 626 to A.D.787. T. & T. Clark. ISBN 9780404032609.
