= The Country Justice =

1618 book by Michael Dalton

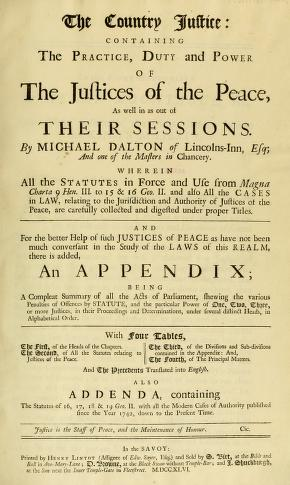
- Author: Michael Dalton
- Original title: The Countrey Justice: Conteyning the Practise of the Justices of the Peace Out of Their Sessions, Gathered for the Better Helpe of Such Justices of Peace as Have Not Beene Much Conversant in the Studie of the Lawes of this Realme
- Published: 1618

The Country Justice was written by Michael Dalton and first published in 1618. The subtext reads: Conteyning the Practise of the Justices of the Peace Out of Their Sessions, Gathered for the Better Helpe of Such Justices of Peace as Have Not Beene Much Conversant in the Studie of the Lawes of this Realme.

The book is a manual which was used by English justices of the peace. It went through about 20 editions between its first edition in 1618 and the last in 1746. The book draws on earlier works: William Lambarde's Eirenarcha (1581) and Richard Crompton's Loffice & aucthority de Iustices de Peace (1593, expanded from Anthony Fitzherbert's La Novelle Natura Brevium of 1534). It offers advice on a wide range of issues including levying customs, highways, prisons, riots, soldiers, murder, felonies, rogues, vagabonds, wool and high treason. The alphabetical listing of topics was groundbreaking and was a model for the structure of other books that came later.

The Country Justice was one of many, but perhaps the most influential, of legal handbooks through which English common law entered into the legal system of early settlement in New England. Dalton was a justice of the peace in Cambridge and wrote this handbook to guide local justices of the peace who had no formal legal training. The simple, direct writing style contributed to the book's popularity in England and the colonies. There was an earlier handbook, also alphabetized, written by William Lambarde, called the Eirenarcha. By 1619 Lambarde's book had already seen 13 editions.

Included among the many issues in The Country Justice were guidelines for witchcraft and witches. Dalton emphasized the need for body searches to find evidence of demonic contacts.
