= Thomas Dalton =

Thomas Dalton may refer to:

- Thomas de Kirkcudbright (before 1294–1324×1326), also known as Thomas de Dalton, medieval prelate from the Kingdom of Scotland
- Thomas Dalton (abolitionist) (1794–1883), African American abolitionist
- Thomas Dalton (Australian politician) (1829–1901), Irish-born Australian politician
- Thomas Dalton Johnston, Canadian politician, active from 1923 to 1926
- Tom Dalton (1904–1981), Australian politician and member of the New South Wales Legislative Assembly
- Thomas d'Alton (1895–1968), Australian politician
- Thomas Dalton (merchant) (1516/17–1591), English merchant, landowner, and Member of Parliament
- Thomas Dalton, MP for Leicester, 1455–56
- Thomas Dalton (judge) (before 1702–1730), English judge and Chief Baron of the Irish Exchequer
