= William L'Isle =

William L'Isle (also Lisle) (1569–1637) was an English antiquary and scholar of Anglo-Saxon literature.

== Life ==
He was second of the five sons of Edmond Lisle of Tandridge, Surrey; the family probably took its name from the Isle of Ely. His mother was Dorothy, daughter of Thomas Rudston of Cambridgeshire. His father's sister Mary was mother by her second husband of Thomas Ravis, later bishop of London, at whose request L'Isle composed an epigram against Andrew Melvill. He was also related to Sir Henry Spelman the antiquary. His eldest brother, George, settled at South Petherton in Somerset. Of his younger brothers, Edmund became sewer of the chamber to Queen Elizabeth, James I, and Charles I, and captain of Walmer Castle; Nicholas and Thomas respectively married the two daughters of Nicholas Brooke, sewer of the chamber to Elizabeth.

L'Isle was a scholar at Eton College, and in 1584 entered King's College, Cambridge. He graduated B.A. in 1589 and M.A. in 1592 and became a Fellow of his college. He resigned his fellowship after 1608 in order to take possession of an estate which had been left him in the ancestral home at Wilbraham, Cambridgeshire.

Subsequently, L'Isle became one of the esquires extraordinary to James I. He returned to Cambridge and spent most of his time there. He took part in a violent quarrel in King's College in August 1608, which resulted in the wounding of the vice-chancellor Roger Goad. Goad brought the matter to the notice of the chancellor, Robert Cecil, 1st Earl of Salisbury; L'Isle then wrote submitting to Salisbury's jurisdiction and begging not to be deprived for his offence, citing thirty years' study in the university, and no action was apparently taken against him.

L'Isle was taken ill at Chesterton Cambridgeshire, and was moved to Wilbraham, where he died in September 1637. Like his younger brother Edmund, who died a month later, he was buried at Walmer, where a monument to their memory was erected in the church.

== Works ==
Lisle was a pioneer in the study of Anglo-Saxon. He is one of the known owners of the E manuscript of the Anglo-Saxon Chronicle, the so-called Peterborough Chronicle, in which he made notes on interleaved pages.

Interest in the doctrinal position of the early English church on various points in controversy in his day first led him in that direction. In 1623 he printed and published for the first time, with an English translation, the ‘Treatise on the Old and New Testament,’ by Ælfric Grammaticus, whom Lisle wrongly identified with Ælfric of Abingdon the archbishop of Canterbury. Lisle found the manuscript in Sir Robert Bruce Cotton's library (Bodl. Laud E. 19). An appendix contained ‘the Homilies and Epistles of the fore-said Ælfricus,’ and a second edition of ‘A Testimonie of Antiquitie, etc., touching the Sacrament of the Bodie and Bloud of the Lord,’ first issued by Archbishop Matthew Parker and Parker's secretary, John Joscelyn in 1566. There follow two extracts from (a) Ælfric's ‘Epistle to Walfine, Bishop of Scyrburne,’ and (b) his ‘Epistle to Wulfstan, Archbishop of York,’ expressing disapproval of a long preservation of the consecrated elements after Easter day. The book concludes with the Lord's Prayer, the Creed, and Ten Commandments in Anglo-Saxon, with a verbal interlinear translation intended to serve as exercises for beginners.

There was a second edition of this "Saxon Treatise" under the title of Divers Ancient Monuments in 1638, the year after his death. The major editions of Anglo-Saxon works which he had projected were Ælfric's translations of the Pentateuch, and the books of Joshua, Judges, and Job, and also the Saxon-English Psalter.

Lisle was also the author of some verse. In 1598 he published translations of parts of Du Bartas's Weeks, but no copy is extant. In 1625 appeared a still larger instalment of Du Bartas in English and French, ‘so neare the French Englisshed as may teach an Englishman French, or a Frenchman English. With the commentary of S. G[oulart de] S[enlis].’ The portion translated includes the end of the fourth book of ‘Adam’ and all four books of ‘Noah,’ the subjects of the poems for the first two days of the second week. The volume closes with an ‘Epistle dedicatorie to the Lord Admirall,’ Lord Howard of Effingham dated 1596, and evidently a reprint from the original edition. In 1619 he wrote two Latin hexameter poems addressed to his neighbour, Michael Dalton, and prefixed to the second edition of his Countrey Justice published in that year. In 1628 appeared ‘Virgil's Eclogues, translated into English by W. L., Gent.,’ with the gloss of Ludovicus Vives. Part of these had been translated as early as 1600, though not published.

He brought out in 1631 a rhymed version, with abridgments and additions, of Heliodorus' Aethiopica. Lisle also wrote the verse inscription on the tomb of William Benson, his aunt Mary Lisle's second son by her first husband, who was buried in St Olave's, Southwark.
