= Dundalk Historic District =

Historic district in Maryland, United States

- U.S. National Register of Historic Places
- U.S. Historic district
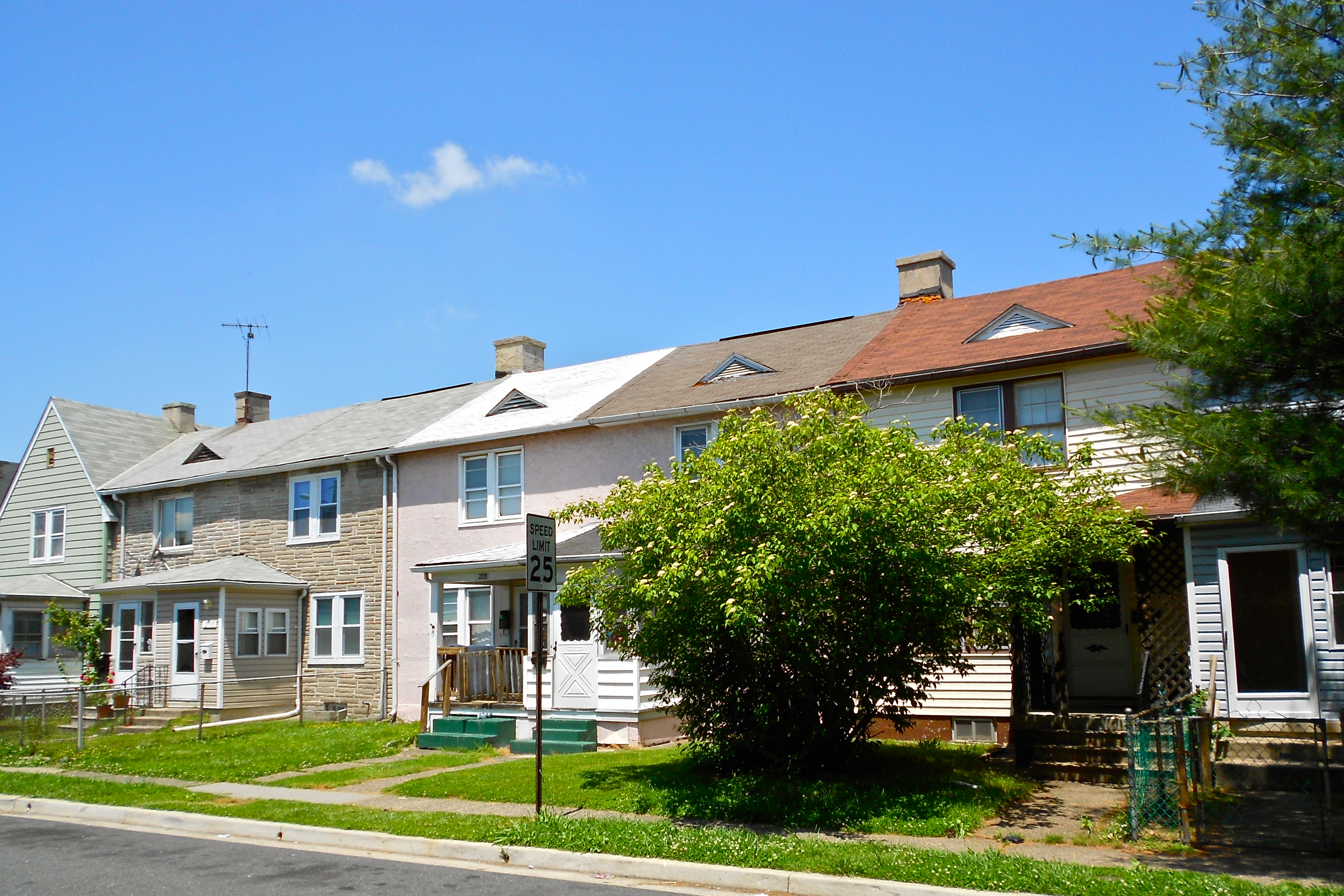
- Houses in the Dundalk Historic District, May 2012

- Location within Baltimore Location within Maryland Location within the United States
- Location: Roughly bounded by Liberty Pkwy., Dunman, Willow Spring and Sunship Rds., Chesapeake and Patapsco Aves., Baltimore, Maryland
- Coordinates: 39°15′35″N 76°31′26″W
- Area: 122 acres (49 ha)
- Built: 1893
- Architect: Palmer, Edward L.
- Architectural style: Late 19th And 20th Century Revivals, Modern Movement
- NRHP reference No.: 83003630
- Added to NRHP: December 8, 1983

Dundalk Historic District is a national historic district in Baltimore, and Baltimore County, Maryland, United States. The district is a cohesive unit made up of residential, commercial, and institutional buildings with structures that generally date from 1910 to 1940. Major architectural styles represented include Period Revival (particularly Colonial Revival and Tudor Revival) and Art Deco/Streamline Moderne. The District includes 962 resources contribute to its significance. It includes the only two housing developments built by the United States Shipping Board Merchant Fleet Corporation (EFC) in Maryland during World War I and reflects experimentation with Garden City planning ideals. Many of the buildings within the District represent the work of noted Baltimore architect Edward L. Palmer Jr.

It was added to the National Register of Historic Places in 1985.
