= Grady W. Dalton =

American politician (died 1986)

Member of the Virginia House of Delegates from the Tazewell County district
- In office 1958–1971

Personal details
- Born: Grady William Dalton Stuart, Virginia, U.S.
- Died: March 5, 1986 (aged 77) Charlottesville, Virginia, U.S.
- Resting place: Stuart Cemetery
- Party: Democratic
- Spouse: Freya H.
- Children: 1
- Parent: Booker Dalton (father)
- Occupation: Politician; banker

Grady William Dalton (died March 5, 1986) was an American politician and banker from Virginia. He served in the Virginia House of Delegates from 1958 to 1971.

== Early life ==
Grady William Dalton was born in Stuart, Virginia, to Lilla S. (née Shockley) and Booker Dalton. His father was a state delegate from Patrick County.

== Career ==
In 1940, Dalton moved to Richlands. He worked as a banker for the Commercial Bank of Bluefield. He later joined Richlands National Bank and retired as its president and chairman of the board in 1985.

Dalton was a Democrat. He was elected to the Virginia House of Delegates in 1957. He represented Tazewell County as a delegate from 1958 to 1971, when he lost the Democratic nomination. He served on the appropriations, education and mining committees. He also served on the Governor's Aviation Committee and the Budget Advisory Committee under four governors. He was a segregationist. In 1968, when a U.S. visa was denied to Ian Smith, he called for a resolution in the House to recognize Rhodesia as an independent nation.

Dalton operated Richlands Airport and was active with the Civil Air Patrol.

== Personal life ==
Dalton married Freya H. They had a son, Richard Booker. He lived on Washington Square in Richlands.

Dalton died on March 5, 1986, aged 77, at the University of Virginia Hospital in Charlottesville. He was buried in Stuart Cemetery.

== Awards ==
Following his death, a cancer research fund was established at Virginia Medical Center in his honor. Dalton was inducted into the Virginia Aviation Hall of Fame in 1985.
