= HMS Melampus =

Six ships of the Royal Navy have been named HMS Melampus after the legendary Greek soothsayer Melampus.

- HMS Melampus (1757) was a fifth-rate frigate captured in 1757 and sold soon afterwards.
- HMS Melampus (1785) was a fifth-rate frigate built in 1785 and sold in 1815 after service in the French Revolutionary and Napoleonic Wars.
- HMS Melampus (1820) was a fifth-rate frigate built in 1820 and sold in 1908.
- HMS Melampus (1890) was an Apollo-class protected cruiser built in 1890 and sold in 1910.
- HMS Melampus (1914) was a destroyer built in 1914 which was broken up in 1921 after service in the First World War.
- HMS Melampus (1941) was a shore establishment at Bathurst between 1941 and 1945.
