= John Waller (cricketer) =

English cricketer

Personal information
- Full name: John Waller
- Born: 17 October 1824; Camberwell, London, England
- Died: 7 April 1886 (aged 61); Brooklyn, New York, United States
- Batting: Unknown
- Bowling: Unknown

Career statistics
Competition	First-class
Matches	4
Runs scored	35
Batting average	5.83
100s/50s	–/–
Top score	21
Balls bowled	8
Wickets	0
Bowling average	–
5 wickets in innings	–
10 wickets in match	–
Best bowling	–
Catches/stumpings	-/-
- Source: Cricinfo, 22 December 2018

John Waller (17 October 1824 – 7 April 1886) was an English first-class cricketer.

Waller was born at Camberwell in October 1824. He made his debut in first-class cricket for the Surrey Club against the Marylebone Cricket Club (MCC) at Lord's in 1853. He made two further first-class appearances for the Surrey Club in 1854 and 1855, both against the MCC, before playing his final first-class match for the Gentlemen of the South against the Gentlemen of the North in 1862 at The Oval. He scored a total of 35 runs across his four first-class matches, with a highest score of 21. He died in the United States at Brooklyn in April 1886.
