= Richard Dalton =

Richard Dalton may refer to:

- Richard Dalton (canoeist) (born 1979), Irish-born, Canadian sprint canoer
- Richard Dalton (cricketer) (born 1965), former English cricketer
- Sir Richard Dalton (diplomat) (born 1948), British diplomat
- Richard Dalton (editor), former editor of the Whole Earth Software Catalog
- Richard Dalton (librarian) (c. 1715–1791), English engraver and art dealer for George III
- Richard J. Dalton (born 1972), American electronic dance music DJ
