= John Neale Dalton =

English clergyman and author (1839–1931)

Canon John Neale Dalton
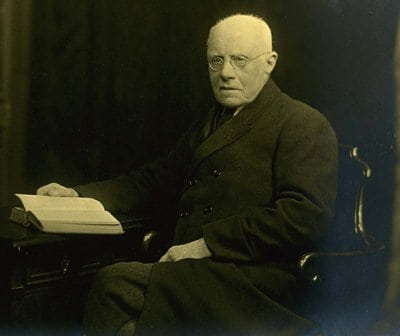
- Born: September 24, 1839
- Died: July 28, 1931
- Known for: Royal Guardianship
- Spouse: Catherine Evan-Thomas (1886-1931)
- Children: Edward Hugh John Neale Dalton, Alexandra Mary

Canon John Neale Dalton KCVO CMG (24 September 1839 – 28 July 1931) was a Church of England clergyman and author. He was a chaplain to Queen Victoria, a Canon of Windsor, and tutor to the future King George V and his brother Prince Albert Victor.

== Life history ==
Dalton was born in Margate, Kent, the son of the Reverend John Neale Dalton and Elisa Maria Allies. He attended Blackheath Proprietary School before matriculating to Clare College, Cambridge, in 1858. Dalton was an extremely able student and achieved his BA (1st class) in 1863, and his MA (Cantab) in 1866; also winning the Schofield Prize during his studies in 1864.

Dalton was appointed curate to Canon George Prothero in the parish of Whippingham on the Isle of Wight in 1869. The church was attended by the royal family when staying at their summer home, Osborne, on the island. Queen Victoria came to know Dalton, and chose him to become tutor to her grandsons, the royal princes George Frederick and his elder brother, Prince Albert Victor, Duke of Clarence. Dalton had been second choice as tutor, after Edward Carpenter, another clergyman who had been a student at Cambridge University at the same time as Dalton and who remained a lifelong friend. Carpenter was a campaigner for socialist reform and homosexual liberation: Dalton later wrote to him "yet still I can't help thinking that our outlook on life and its problems is not so wholly dissimilar as one might imagine it would be" The royal children were then 6 and 7, and Victoria considered her son, the then Prince of Wales Albert Edward, had been neglecting their education. Dalton moved to Windsor castle and continued as their tutor through the next fourteen years.

The younger prince, George, proved the more able and willing to learn. His brother and presumed eventual heir to the throne, Albert Victor, called "Eddy" by the family, was considered backward, lazy and obtuse. It was considered that although George was expected to follow a career in the navy, it would be unwise to separate him from his brother as he was considered a good influence upon him. Accordingly, both boys joined the cadet training ship HMS Britannia in September 1877. Dalton accompanied the boys, sharing a cabin with them while continuing to act as their guardian, and acted as chaplain to the ship. Despite Dalton's presence, the princes (Eddy nicknamed 'Herring' and George 'Sprat') were bullied by other cadets keen to have a go at accessible royalty. One cadet, Hugh Thomas was approved of by Dalton and began a friendship with the princes which continued for some years.

In 1879 training on Britannia came to end. It was again proposed that Eddy should attend a public school, but Dalton recommended the brothers should remain together. Instead it was arranged that both princes and Dalton should sail on HMS Bacchante with a crew carefully selected to be a good influence on the boys. The captain, Lord Charles Scott, was a son of the Duke of Buccleuch, while his nephew John, the future 7th Duke was part of the crew. Other crew were also chosen for their royal connections, as in the case of Hugh Evan-Thomas (surname now officially changed by his father) who was posted to the same watch as the princes. Dalton saw it as his responsibility, despite royal instructions that the princes should be treated 'just like other ordinary midshipmen', to restrict their contact with other members of the crew, shifting away anyone who became too friendly.

The tour ended in August 1882, when Dalton and his charges returned with the ship to England. He took with him numerous mementoes of the tour, including the sailor who had been assigned as his servant during the voyage, who continued to work for him ashore for the next 50 years. He also obtained an introduction to Evan-Thomas' sister Catherine, who shortly afterwards agreed to marry him despite being considerably younger. Prince George returned to the navy, but Eddy remained a low achiever and continued a further year intensive tutoring with Dalton in preparation for attending the University of Cambridge.

Dalton married Catherine Evan-Thomas on 16 January 1886. A. C. Benson, whom he had met when Benson became friendly with Eddy at university, was his best man. Benson wrote in his diary "Dalton showed me much fatherly kindness". Dalton described the homosexual Benson as "an object of adoration". Their first son Edward Hugh John Neale Dalton, later to enter politics and become Labour Chancellor of the Exchequer Hugh Dalton, was born at home in Neath, Glamorgan, August 1887. Hugh Evan-Thomas and Prince Edward were his godparents. Their second child, Alexandra Mary, was born in 1891, but in accord with Dalton's wish to have had a second son who he could have named after Prince George, was nicknamed 'Georgie'.

In 1892 Prince George briefly assumed command of HMS Melampus during her commissioning and trials. Dalton was invited on board as George's guest.

Dalton became Curate of Sandringham and a Canon of St. George's Chapel, Windsor. He was also Chaplain-in-ordinary and Deputy Clerk of the Closet to Queen Victoria and then Edward VII, Chaplain to Prince George as Duke of York and Prince of Wales.

He was invested as a Companion, Order of St Michael and St George (CMG) in 1881 and Knight Commander, Royal Victorian Order (KCVO) in 1911. In 1920 he was awarded an Honorary Doctorate of Laws (LLD) by the University of Leeds.

== Publications ==
Dalton was an antiquarian and liturgical scholar. He published various books including:

- Sermons to Naval Cadets, 1879, produced while acting as naval chaplain accompanying the Royal Princes, Albert and George
- The Cruise of Her Majesty’s Ship “Bacchante” 1879-1882, MacMillan and Co., 1886 (as Contributor)
- The Collegiate Church of Ottery S. Mary, Cambridge Univ. Press, 1917, xxIv + 310 pp., 27 illust.
- The Book of Common Prayer: An edition containing proposals and suggestions compiled by John Neale Dalton, Canon of Windsor, (Cambridge: Cambridge University Press, 1920)

== Family ==
In 1886, Dalton married Catherine ("Kitty") Alicia Evan Thomas of Neath; their son was Hugh Dalton, later a prominent politician.

Dalton's brothers were:

- Rev. William Edward Dalton (1841–1928), Vicar of Glynde, Sussex
- Sir Cornelius Neale Dalton (1842–1920), Comptroller-General of the UK Intellectual Property Office

Dalton was godfather to the surgeon Sir Alfred Downing Fripp.

=== Neale ===
Dalton was descended from the Neale family, from whom strong family naming is evident:

- James Neale, b. ~1760
  - Hannah Mae Neale, his daughter, b. 1784 who married John Dalton
  - his sons:
    - Benjamin Neale, b. 1786
    - Samuel Neale, b. 1788
    - Cornelius Neale, b. 1789
      - John Mason Neale, b. 1818, son of Cornelius
