= Cornelius Neale Dalton =

British barrister, civil servant, author

Portrait by Walter Stoneman, c. 1916

Sir Cornelius Neale Dalton KCMG CB (24 September 1842 in Walthamstow – 19 October 1920 in Hampstead) was a British barrister, civil servant, and author.

After education at Blackheath Proprietary School, Cornelius Neale Dalton matriculated in October 1861 at the University of Cambridge. He graduated there with B.A. in 1865 and M.A. in 1870. He was admitted to the Inner Temple in April 1864 and was called to the Bar in 1871. He entered the Civil Service in 1873. Neale was from 1878 to 1883 Inspector of Local Loans and Local Acts, in 1883 Assistant Secretary to the Local Government Board, and from 1891 to 1892 Member of the Royal Commission on Tithe Redemption. He was from 1893 to 1897 Member of the Royal Commission on Agriculture, from 1896 to 1901 Member of the Royal Commission on Local Taxation, and from 1897 to 1909 Comptroller-General of Patents (working at the Patent Office headquarters). He was made C.B. in 1894 and K.C.M.G. in 1908.

He was the author of The Real Captain Kidd (1911) and The Life of Thomas Pitt (1915). He frequently contributed articles to London's The Saturday Review.

He married in 1873 and there were children from the marriage. Cornelius Neale Dalton, the third son of Reverend John Neale Dalton, was a brother of John Neale Dalton.
