= William Dalton (author) =

British writer

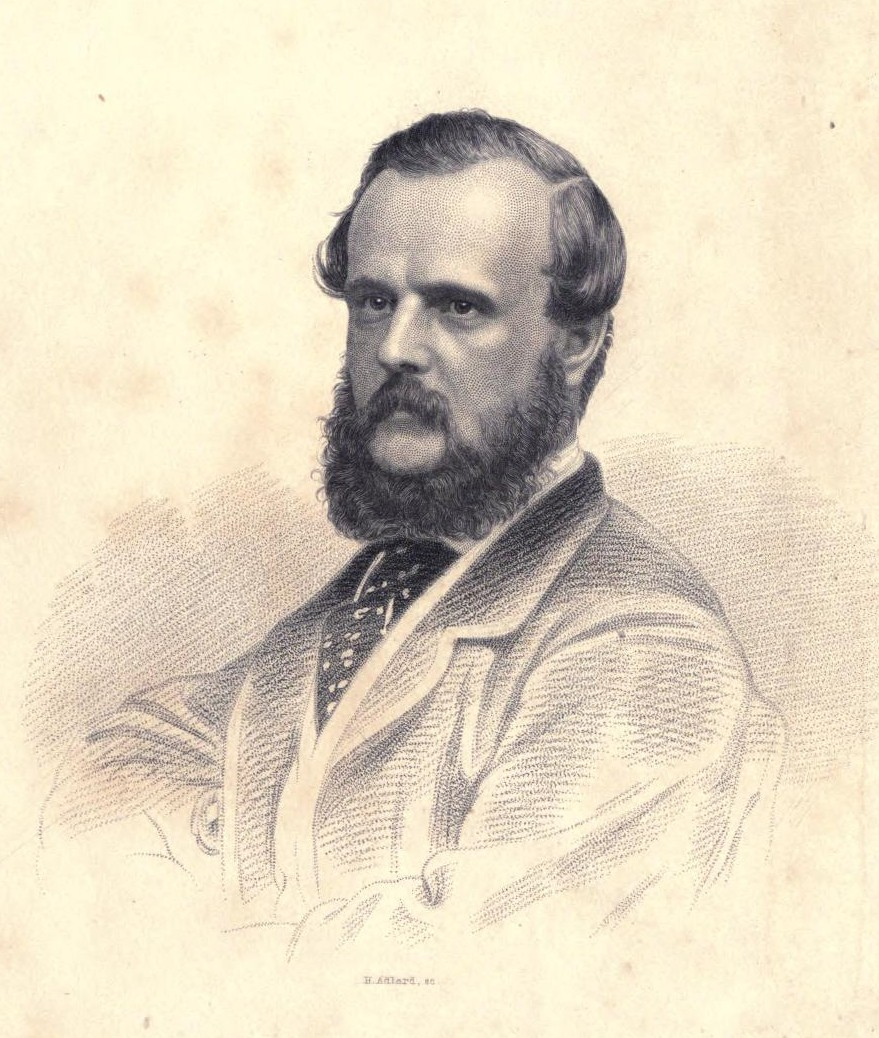

William Dalton (1821–1875) was a Victorian-era British writer of adventure stories for youth set in exotic locations such as China, Japan and Peru. He wrote most of his books during a seven-year period between about 1857 to 1864. He was also chief Editor of the London Daily Telegraph for some time.

Dalton was the first among many authors to novelize the true story of William Adams, who was the first Englishman to reach Japan in the 17th century. His "romantic biography" is called Will Adams, the First Englishman in Japan (1861). It is not an accurate history - Dalton never went to Japan, he relied on old sources and fictionalized the story - but it is a reflection of 19th century British stereotypes of Japan, about which little was known in the years immediately after Perry's arrival. Later authors would also novelize the Adams story, the best known is James Clavell's Shōgun (1975) and subsequent 1980 film.

== Works ==
Source.

- "Is Killing Murder?" A key to the adulteration of our daily food. Compiled from the evidence given before the committee of the House of Commons in the years 1855–6. London, E. Marlborough & Co., 1857.
- The Wolf Boy of China; or, Incidents and Adventures in the Life of Lyu-Payo. Bath, Binns & Goodwin, 1857; Boston, J. Munroe & Co., 1859; as John Chinaman; or, Adventures in Flowery Land, Boston, Crosby & Nichols, 1858.
- The English Boy in Japan; or, The Perils and Adventures of Mark Raffles among Princes, Priests, and People, of that singular empire. London, T. Nelson & Sons, 1858.
- The War Tiger; or, Adventures and Wonderful Fortunes of the Young Sea Chief and His Lad Chow. A tale of the conquest of China, illus. H. S. Melville. London, Griffith & Farran, 1859; New York, W. A. Townsend, 1861.
- The White Elephant; or, The Hunters of Ava and the King of the Golden Foot, illus. Harrison Weir. London, Griffith & Farran, 1860; New York, W. A. Townsend, 1860.
- Lost in Ceylon. The story of a boy and girl's adventures in the woods and the wilds of the Lion King of Kandy, illus. Harrison Weir. London, Griffith & Farran, 1861.
- Will Adams, the First Englishman in Japan. A romantic Biography. London, A. W. Bennett, 1861; New York, Cassell, Petter & Galpin, 1861.
- Cortes and Pizarro. The stories of the conquests of Mexico and Peru, with a sketch of early adventures of the Spaniards in the New World, illus. John Gilbert. London, Griffin, Bohn, and Co., 1862 [1861].
- Phaulcon the Adventurer; or, The Europeans in the East. A romantic biography. London, S. O. Beeton, 1862.
- The Nest Hunters; or, Adventures in the Indian Archipelago. London, Arthur Hall & Co., 1863; as A Royal Smuggler; or, The Adventures of Two Boys in the Indian Archipelago, Chicago, M. A. Donahue, 1902.
- The Tiger Prince; or, Adventures in the Wilds of Abyssinia. London, Virtue Bros. & Co., 1863; Boston, Roberts, 1865.
- The Wasps of the Ocean; or, Little Waif and the Pirate of the Eastern Seas. A romance of travel and adventure in China and Siam. London, E. Marlborough & Co., 1864.
- Lost Among the Wild Men. Being incidents in the life of an old salt. London & New York, George Routledge & Sons, 1868.
- The Powder Monkey; or, The Adventures of Two Boy Heroes in the Island of Madagascar. London, James Blackwood & Co., 1874.
- The Persian Chief. A tale of the manners and customs of Persia. London, James Blackwood & Co., 1882.
