= James T. Dalton =

American pharmaceutical researcher

James Dalton
- Born: 1963 (age 62–63)

Academic background
- Education: BSc., University of Cincinnati; PhD., pharmaceutics and pharmaceutical chemistry, Ohio State University
- Thesis: Pharmacokinetic and pharmacodynamic implications of drug absorption from urinary bladder (1990)

James Tilmon Dalton is an American pharmacist and drug discovery scientist. He is Executive Vice President of the LSU System & Chancellor of Louisiana State University.

== Career ==
As a pharmacy intern and then pharmacist, Dalton worked at Kettering Medical Center. After earning his PhD, Dalton was appointed as assistant professor in the Department of Pharmaceutical Sciences at the University of Tennessee. As a professor at the University of Tennessee, Dalton led the research group that first reported selective androgen receptor modulators (SARMs; enobosarm). In 1997, Dalton’s group published the first report on SARMs, which was used to research and create a class of potential drugs to treat age and disease-related muscle loss. Dalton also led the research group that invented sabizabulin, a tubulin inhibitor under development for the treatment of cancer and SARS-CoV-2 (COVID-19).

From there, he was promoted to associate professor and moved to The Ohio State University (OSU) College of Pharmacy faculty. Dalton was eventually promoted to full professor and Chair of the Division of Pharmaceutics. While at OSU, he was elected a Fellow of the American Association of Pharmaceutical Scientists. The year following his fellowship election, Dalton left OSU to become Chief Scientific Officer at GTx Incorporated. Dalton left GTx in 2014 to become the Dean of Pharmaceutical Sciences at the University of Michigan. The next year, he was elected a fellow of the American Association for the Advancement of Science.

In 2019, Dalton was one of three UMich faculty members elected to National Academy of Medicine.

In 2020, Dalton was appointed Executive Vice President & Provost at the University of Alabama in Tuscaloosa.

In 2025, Dalton was appointed Executive Vice President of the LSU System & Chancellor of Louisiana State University in Baton Rouge.
