= Reg Dalton =

English footballer

Personal information
- Full name: Reginald Dalton
- Date of birth: 19 July 1896
- Place of birth: Foleshill, England
- Date of death: 1979 (aged 82–83)
- Position: Wing-half

Senior career*
Years	Team	Apps	(Gls)
1918–1919	Edgewick		
1919–1924	Coventry City	54	(4)
1924–1925	Halifax Town	0	(0)
1925	Foleshill Great Heath		
1926	Nuneaton Town		
1927	Foleshill Great Heath		
Total		54	(4)
- * Club domestic league appearances and goals

Reginald Dalton (19 July 1896 – 1979) was an English footballer who played in the Football League for Coventry City.
