= Booker Dalton =

American politician (1869–1948)

Member of the Virginia House of Delegates from the Patrick County district
- In office January 14, 1914 – January 12, 1916
- Preceded by: S. Tyler Rakes
- Succeeded by: Edmund Parr

Personal details
- Born: December 28, 1869 Patrick County, Virginia, U.S.
- Died: December 13, 1948 (aged 78) Stuart, Virginia, U.S.
- Resting place: Stuart Primitive Baptist Church Cemetery
- Party: Democratic
- Spouse: Lilla S. Shockley (m. 1894)
- Children: 9, including Grady
- Occupation: Politician

Booker Dalton (December 28, 1869 – December 13, 1948) was an American politician from Virginia. He served as a member of the Virginia House of Delegates from 1914 to 1915.

== Early life ==
Booker Dalton was born on December 28, 1869, in Patrick County, Virginia, to Lucy (née Howell) and Willis Dalton. He attended public schools in Patrick County.

== Career ==
Dalton was a Democrat. In 1910, Dalton was appointed commissioner of revenue of Patrick County, succeeding George Wood. He was elected to the role in 1911 and served two years before resigning to run for the Virginia House of Delegates. He served as a member of the Virginia House of Delegates for one term from 1914 to 1915. He then served as game warden for eight years.

In 1923, Dalton was elected as commissioner of revenue for the Mayo district. In 1927, he was elected as commissioner of revenue for Patrick County. He continued in the role until his retirement in 1939.

== Personal life ==
Dalton married Lilla S. Shockley, daughter of Mary (née Dalton) and William H. Shockley, on February 14, 1894. They had seven sons and two daughters, L. S., R. D., H. W., Grady W., D. H., B. A, G. S., Mrs. N. G. Brammer and Mrs. William Rodgers. His son Grady was a state delegate of Tazewell County.

Dalton died on December 13, 1948, at his home in Stuart. He was buried in Stuart Primitive Baptist Church Cemetery.
