= John Waller (perjurer) =

English highwayman and perjurer

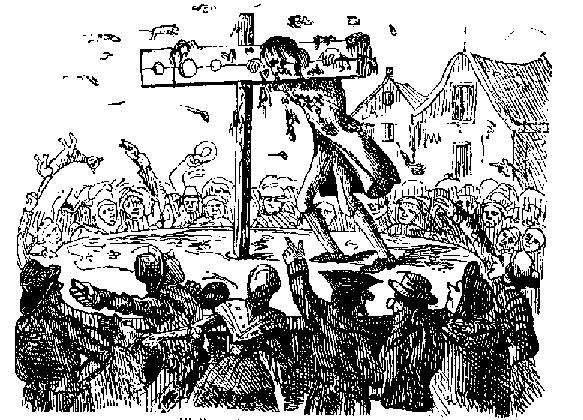
Eighteenth-century illustration of Waller in the pillory

John Waller, an English highwayman and perjurer, was sentenced to a jail term and pillory in 1732 after giving false information to the courts, from which he benefited financially. He was killed while in the pillory by Edward Dalton, whose brother James Dalton had been executed as a consequence of Waller's perjury.
