= Annie Charlotte Dalton =

Canadian poet

Anne Charlotte Dalton MBE
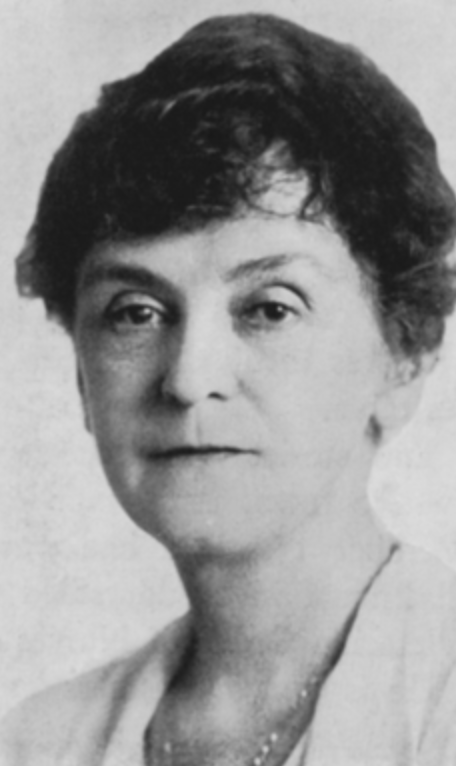
- Annie Charlotte Dalton, from a 1926 publication edited by John William Garvin
- Born: Annie Charlotte Armitage; December 9, 1865; Birkby, Yorkshire, UK
- Died: January 12, 1938 (age 72); Vancouver, British Columbia, Canada
- Occupation: Poet

Annie Charlotte Armitage Dalton MBE (December 9, 1865 – January 12, 1938) was an English-born Canadian poet, sometimes known as "the Poet Laureate of the Deaf."

== Early life ==
Annie Charlotte Armitage was born in Birkby, Yorkshire, the daughter of John Armitage and Sarah Elizabeth Stoney. She was raised in the household of her grandparents, James and Hannah Stoney. She became deaf after a childhood illness.

== Career ==
Dalton published several volumes of poetry. Her work was also published in magazines, newspapers, and anthologies. She was president of the Vancouver Poetry Club, and a member of the Canadian Authors Association, among other literary organizations. She was active in the Vancouver Poetry Society alongside fellow members Bliss Carman, Lorne Pierce, A. M. Stephen, and Charles G. D. Roberts. She and Pierce were both deaf, and discussed their deafness in correspondence.

== Honours ==
In 1935, Dalton was made a Member of the Order of the British Empire (OBE), for her services to literature. She received the Tweedsmuir Medal from Canadian Poetry Magazine for The Neighing North.

== Publications ==
Much of Dalton's poetry has Canadian themes, and titles such as The Ear Trumpet (1926) and The Silent Zone (1926) reference her experiences as a deaf woman. "It is in her later volumes, which are largely cosmic in scope and deal with the fundamentals of life, that the power and range of this poet's imagination have left a more permanent impression," noted one of her contemporaries in a 1938 tribute.

- A Souvenir of Vancouver (1906, illustrated by John Kyle)
- "Love Comes Riding Along the Way" (poem)
- The Marriage of Music (1910)
- A Christmas Carol for All Good Soldiers and Sailors (1914)
- Flame and Adventure (1924, illustrated by Charles Ferguson)
- Songs and Carols (1925)
- The Ear Trumpet (1926)
- The Silent Zone (1926, illustrated by Joan Goodall)
- The Amber Riders & Other Poems (1929)
- The Neighing North (1931, illustrated by James Williamson Galloway Macdonald)
- The Call of the Carillon (1935)
- Lilies and Leopards (1935, illustrated by Rowena Gross)

== Personal life and legacy ==
Annie Armitage married businessman Will Dalton in 1891. They had a daughter, Edith Evelyn. The Daltons moved to Canada in 1904. She died in 1938, at the age of 72, in Vancouver, after years of frail health.

There is a collection of her papers at the University of British Columbia, donated by her grandson, Anthony Dalton Scott, an economist. There is a small collection of 1930s letters by Dalton at the University of Calgary, and other items in the Lorne and Edith Pierce Collection at Queen's University Archives. Dalton's life and work remain the subject of literary scholarship.
