= Alexander Maitland Stephen =

Canadian poet and author who served in World War One (1882–1942)

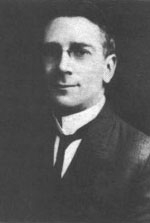
- Born: May 8, 1882; Hanover, Ontario
- Died: July 1, 1942 (aged 60); Vancouver, British Columbia
- Occupations: Poet, novelist
- Writing career
- Period: 20th century
- Genres: Poetry, fiction

Alexander Maitland Stephen (May 8, 1882 – July 1, 1942), often known as A. M. Stephen, was a Canadian author of poetry and fiction.

== Biography ==
Stephen was born near Paisley, Ontario. His parents were Alexander Stephen and Margaret Whiteford. He attended high school in Walkerton, Ontario before he moved out west. He worked at various jobs including ranching, prospecting and as a school teacher. He then enrolled at the University of Chicago where he obtain a degree in architecture.

In 1914, he enlisted in the army and was sent to fight in France with the Canadian Expeditionary Force. He was wounded and returned to Canada. After the war he settled in Vancouver, British Columbia. He married Wealtha Irene Spores and together they raised a son. In Vancouver he became active in social and labour movements. He was president of the Child Welfare Association of B.C. and taught literature and history in the public school system. He became a member of the CCF because of his beliefs in fighting against fascism. He became president of the League Against War and Fascism. He organised fundraising for people in need in Spain and China where both countries were involved in wars against fascist related forces. He also ran for election as the CCF candidate in the 1937 British Columbia general election in the riding of Alberni-Nanaimo, where he finished second of four candidates.

He began writing in the early 1920s. His first book was a volume of poetry called The Rosary of Pan which was published in 1923. He wrote two novels, the first being The Kingdom of the Sun in 1927. Most of his books were published by J.M. Dent and Sons where his brother worked as a vice-president. In March 1942 he became ill with pneumonia and died in Vancouver on July 1, 1942.

== Works ==
- The Rosary Of Pan, (1923)
- The Voice Of Canada: Canadian Prose And Poetry, (1926)
- The Land Of Singing Waters, (1927)
- The Kingdom Of The Sun: A Romance Of The Far West Coast, (1927)
- The Golden Treasury Of Canadian Verse, (1928)
- The Gleaming Archway, (1929)
- Classroom Plays from Canadian History, (1929)
- Brown Earth And Bunch Grass, (1931)
- Canadian Industrial Plays, (1931)
- Verendrye, (1935)
- Lords Of The Air: Poems Of The Present War, (1940)
- Songs for a New Nation, (1963)
