= Albert Clayton Dalton =

United States army officer

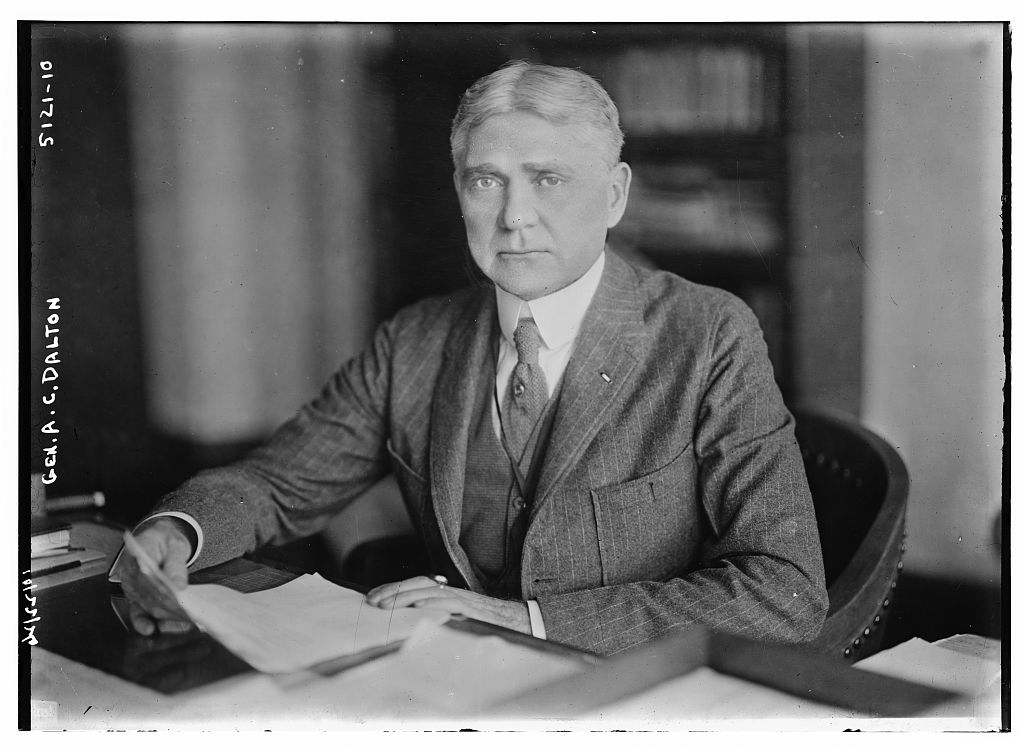
- Born: 2 October 1867; Thorntown, Indiana
- Died: 24 March 1957 (aged 89); Washington, D.C.
- Burial place: Arlington National Cemetery
- Military career
- Allegiance: United States
- Branch: United States Army
- Service years: 1889–1926
- Rank: Brigadier General
- Conflicts: Spanish–American War; Philippine–American War; World War I
- Awards: Army Distinguished Service Medal; Silver Star; Order of the Crown of Romania (Grand Officer)
- Other work: Executive, U.S. Shipping Board Merchant Fleet Corporation

Albert Clayton Dalton (2 October 1867 – 24 March 1957) was a United States army officer. He took part in a number of U.S. military conflicts, including the Spanish–American War, Philippine–American War and World War I. After his retirement from military service, Dalton was an executive of the U.S. Shipping Board Merchant Fleet Corporation.

== Early life and education ==
Dalton was born as Clayton Parrish in Thorntown, Indiana on October 2, 1867, the son of Henry G. Parrish and Lucy A. (Hartpence) Parrish. (Note: Some sources indicate Dalton was born in Lafayette, Indiana. His birthdate of Thorntown, Indiana is confirmed by the U.S. passport application he completed in 1921. In addition, other documents Dalton completed, or for which he provided information directly, also indicate that he was born in Thorntown.) He was educated in the public schools of Boone County and Tippecanoe County.

=== Military education ===
Dalton graduated from the Infantry and Cavalry School (1895) at Fort Leavenworth, Kansas. Dalton was also a graduate of the General Staff School (1920) and the U.S. Army War College (1921).

== Military career ==
In 1889, Dalton changed his name to Albert Clayton Dalton and enlisted in the U.S. army as a member of Company A, 22nd Infantry Regiment. He advanced through the ranks from private to corporal to sergeant, and received his commission as a second lieutenant in 1891. During this time, Dalton took part in conflicts between the U.S. military and American Indians: the Cheyenne Campaign of 1890 and Sioux Campaign of 1891. Later, Dalton was involved in the Spanish–American War, fighting in Cuba during the Santiago Campaign (1898) and also in the subsequent Philippine–American War (1899–1902). Then from 1907 to 1909, Dalton was part of the U.S. occupation force during the Occupation of Cuba. Dalton also took part in the Occupation of Veracruz (1914) and between 1916 and 1917 was stationed on the Mexican-United States border during the Pancho Villa Expedition. Dalton was serving as a major at General Pershing's headquarters when the United States entered World War I in 1917, and from September to October of that year he organized the expeditionary depot in Philadelphia. Dalton then became the General Superintendent of the Army Transport Service in New York from November 1917 – 1918. He was promoted to brigadier general of the National Army and commander of the 18th Infantry Brigade, 9th Infantry Division, Dalton then served in France until August 1919. In 1922, Dalton became the Assistant Quartermaster General in Washington D.C., where he remained until his retirement on 7 July 1926.

Dalton's awards included the Silver Star (1899) for his service in Cuba and the Distinguished Service Medal for World War I, he was also named a Grand Officer of the Crown of Romania.

== Later career ==
Shortly following his retirement from the military, Dalton was appointed president of the United States Shipping Board Merchant Fleet Corporation. He later served as vice president and general manager.

== Personal life and death ==
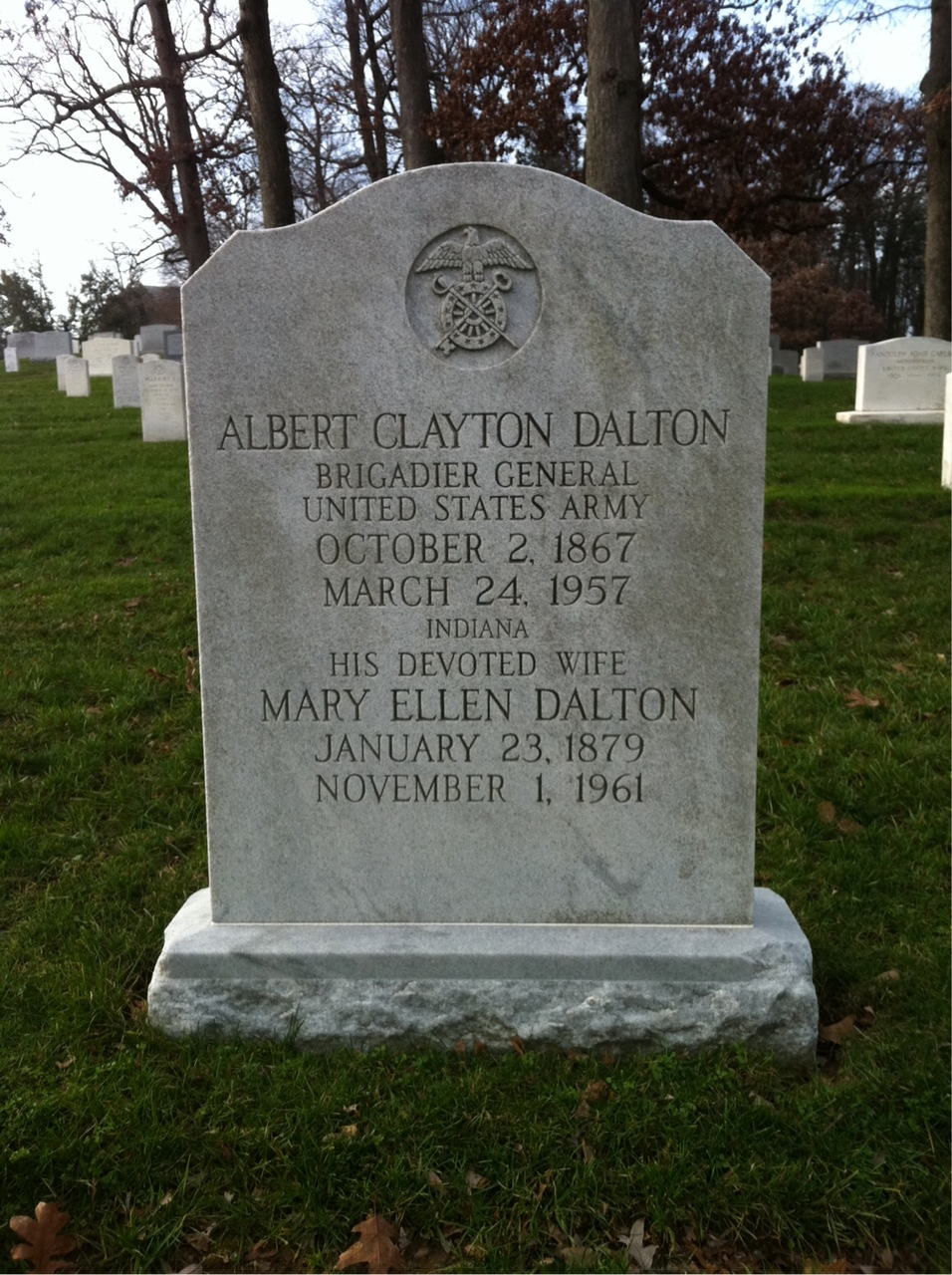
Dalton's grave at Arlington National Cemetery

Dalton was married to Caroline Gordon in 1907. In 1948 he married May Ellen Garner.

Dalton died on 24 March 1957 in Washington D.C. and was buried in Arlington National Cemetery.
