= James Dalton (criminal) =

English criminal/gang member

James Dalton (died 11 May 1730) was captain of a street robbery gang in 18th-century London, England.

== Biography ==
His father, also James Dalton, was Irish and fought as a sergeant in the British Army in Flanders. He was convicted of street robbery on 3 March 1720 and was sentenced to transportation. On being found in London in 1721, reputedly informed upon by the self-appointed Thief-taker General, Jonathan Wild, the elder Dalton was hanged.

His mother remarried a butcher, but both were convicted and sentenced to transportation. By then, the younger Dalton had already begun his criminal career. James Dalton got into the company of thieves as a youngster, picking pockets, breaking shops, and robbing people on the street, in the Smithfield and Old Bailey area.

It is reported that he went on two trips to Bristol, to practice criminal activity there. He was convicted and transported, but persuaded the crew to mutiny near Cape Finisterre. He was pressed into service on HMS Hampshire, and was a spectator of the siege of Gibraltar in 1727. He then returned to London, although this account may be somewhat fanciful.

He gave King's evidence in the trials of various of his underlings in May 1728, and received a Royal pardon for his part in the offences. A "Genuine Narrative" of his exploits was published shortly afterwards.

He was arrested in December 1729. In January 1730, he was convicted for assaulting Dr Mead near Leather Lane in Holborn, for which he was fined and imprisoned for three years.

While he was in prison, he was recognised by John Waller, who claimed that Dalton had robbed him at gunpoint in a field near Bloomsbury. Dalton was tried for highway robbery on 8 April 1730. The complainant was said to be an affidavit man, or "knight of the post", and made similar complaints against a number of other men. Indeed, Waller was convicted of perjury, and he was beaten to death by Edward Dalton, James' brother, and accomplices on 13 June 1732 while he was in the pillory at Seven Dials.

James Dalton admitted having committed other offences, but he denied this one. He also called witnesses to testify that he was not guilty. Nevertheless, he was convicted, and sentenced to death. He was hanged at Tyburn on 11 May 1730.

== In works ==
His main claim to fame is a fleeting reference in plate 3 of William Hogarth's A Harlot's Progress, painted in 1731, in which his wigbox is being stored above the bed of the female protagonist, Moll Hackabout.
