= Joseph Dalton (footballer) =

English footballer

Personal information
- Date of birth: 1915
- Place of birth: Bradford, England
- Height: 5 ft 8 in (1.73 m)
- Position: Left half

Senior career*
Years	Team	Apps	(Gls)
1933–1938	Bradford City	17	(3)
- Shrewsbury Town
- * Club domestic league appearances and goals

Joseph Dalton (born 1915) was an English professional footballer who played as a left half. He also played baseball.

== Career ==
Born in Bradford, Dalton played for Bradford City and Shrewsbury Town. For Bradford City he made 17 appearances in the Football League, scoring 3 goals; he also made 1 appearance in the FA Cup.

Dalton also played baseball for the Amateur Baseball Cup finalists 1937 Thornbury Trojans, and in the semi-professional Lancashire-Yorkshire League for Greenfield Giants in 1938, and League Champions Halifax in 1939. He also played for Yorkshire.

== Sources ==
- Frost, Terry (1988). Bradford City A Complete Record 1903-1988. Breedon Books Sport. ISBN 0-907969-38-0.
