= John Dalton (priest) =

Anglican priest

John Dalton was an Anglican priest in Ireland in the 17th century.

Dalton was educated at Trinity College, Dublin. He was Vicar of Dungarvan; Chancellor of Lismore Cathedral, Ireland from 1665 to 1699; Precentor of Waterford from 1682 to 1699; and Dean of Waterford from 1691 to 1699.
