= Thomas Dalton (judge) =

English-born Irish judge

- Born: Hampshire, England
- Died: 23 June 1730
- Occupation: Chief Baron of the Irish Exchequer
- Spouse: Jane Dyott
- Children: Thomas (minor at time of death)

Thomas Dalton (died 23 June 1730) was an English-born judge in Ireland, who became Chief Baron of the Irish Exchequer.

Dalton was born in Hampshire, the eldest son of the Reverend Peter Dalton. His mother belonged to the prominent Dominick family of Dublin, who gave their name to Dominick Street in Dublin city centre. Sir Christopher Dominick (died 1743), who began laying out the street in the 1720s, was his uncle. He graduated from Queen's College, Oxford in 1702 and became a fellow of All Souls' College in 1706. He was called to the Bar in 1711. In 1725 he was appointed Lord Chief Baron of the Irish Exchequer and held that office until his death in 1730, aged about fifty-five. He was buried in St Andrew's Church, Dublin.

He was married to Jane Dyott, whose father Richard Dyott was the owner of the infamous rookery (slum) in the parish of St Giles, London, generally considered one of the worst slums not only in London but in the whole of Britain. According to a lawsuit over an annuity (bequeathed to him in trust by a certain Lady Wych), which was resolved some four years after his death, Dalton had one son, also named Thomas, who was still a minor at the time of his father's death. Archbishop Boulter after his death wrote compassionately of "his family, who suffered (i.e. financially) from his coming here".

According to Elrington Ball, during his years at Oxford he had a reputation for pride and arrogance; enemies called him a proud empty Whig, who offended his Tory opponents by throwing a celebration dinner on each anniversary of the execution of Charles I. However, he earned a good reputation as Chief Baron and after his premature death tributes were paid in verse to him as a "learned and unbiased judge."

Dalton's high reputation in Ireland is confirmed by a letter written by Hugh Boulter, the influential Archbishop of Armagh, who was consulted on all senior judicial appointments. Richard West, the Lord Chancellor of Ireland, had died suddenly at the end of 1726: Boulter wrote to the Lord Lieutenant, Lord Granville, recommending Thomas Wyndham, who was successful in obtaining the office. Should Wyndham prove unsuitable for any reason, the Archbishop recommended Dalton, as "having a very good character here, and being well skilled in the affairs of Ireland." After Dalton's death Boulter wrote that the Crown had never had a more zealous, able and diligent servant.

Dalton died on 23 June 1730, after a short illness. According to his friends the crushing workload in the Court of Exchequer (Ireland) hastened his end.
