= Michael Dalton (legal writer) =

English barrister and legal writer

Michael Dalton (1564–1644) was an English barrister and legal writer, author of two works well known in his time.

== Life ==
He was the son of Thomas Dalton of Hildersham, Cambridgeshire, and matriculated at Trinity College, Cambridge in 1580.

He was associated with Lincoln's Inn, moving there from Furnivall's Inn, being called to the bar and eventually becoming a bencher. He resided at West Wratting, Cambridgeshire, and was in the commission of the peace for the county.

== Works ==
Dalton published:

- The Countrey Justice, London, 1618, a treatise on the jurisdiction of justices of the peace out of session. Anthony Fitzherbert in L'Office et Auctoritee de Justices de Peace, 1514, English translation 1538) and William Lambarde (Eirenarcha, 1610) had already devoted substantive treatises to the duties of justices. Dalton's book differed from these in the limitation of its scope and the extent of its detail. It covered the types of case and offence where a magistrate (justice of the peace) could administer summary justice under statute law, there having been an extensive list of such situations (from poaching to poor church attendance) since the 16th century. A second edition appeared in 1619 ("newly corrected and inlarged"), prefaced by commendatory Latin verses by John Richardson, William Burton the Regius Professor of Physic at Cambridge, Isaac Barrow described as ‘affinis,’ and William L'Isle, and other editions in 1622 (reprinted from 1619) and in 1626 ("third time"). It was published "for the fourth time" in 1630, and twice in 1635 for the "fifth time" and the "sixth time"; in 1643 again for the "sixth time." Other revised and enlarged editions came in 1655 and 1661. In 1666 the work was edited by a certain T. M. of Lincoln's Inn, who added a treatise on the jurisdiction in sessions, and new matter. Subsequent editions appeared in 1677, 1682, 1690, 1697, 1705, 1715, 1727, and 1742 (reissued 1746).
- Officium Vicecomitum, or the Office and Authoritie of Sheriffs, London, 1623. An abridgment appeared in 1628 The last edition of this book was published in 1700.

Dalton's works were sufficiently widely known for it to be suggested that his view of rules of evidence can account for conduct of the defendants in the trial of Thomas Cornell for murdering his mother, Rebecca Cornell, in Rhode Island in 1673. Material on witchcraft passed into later editions of the Countrey Justice from earlier works (the Discoverie of Witches (1613) of Thomas Potts and the Guide to Grand-Jury Men (1627) of Richard Barnard), and was transmitted from there to the An Assistance to Justices of the Peace (1683) of Joseph Keble.

Dalton also wrote an unpublished religious work in the tradition of Acts and Monuments, finished 1634 but left in manuscript. It was considered for publication by the Long Parliament in 1641, but the more extensive work of Thomas Harding was preferred by a committee under Edward Dering; in fact neither was printed. There exists a summary in the British Library. It is an abstract of events in chronological sequence from the foundation of Christianity to ‘the discovery of anti-christ’ in the sixteenth century.

== Personal life ==
Dalton married first, Frances, a daughter of William Thornton, and secondly Mary, a daughter of Edward Allington.

In 1631 Dalton was fined for having allowed his daughter Dorothy to marry her maternal uncle, Sir Giles Allington of Horseheath, Cambridgeshire. The fine, however, was remitted.
