= Michael Dalton (gambler) =

Michael Dalton (born 1955) is a gambling author, publisher and founder of the Blackjack Review Network. He is best known for his Encyclopedia of Casino Twenty-One (formerly titled Blackjack: A Professional Reference) and Blackjack Review Magazine, which was published from 1992 through 1998.

Dalton became interested in blackjack and advantage play while working for NASA in the 1980s. After receiving his master's degree in Space Technology in 1985, Dalton found card counting to be an exciting diversion. Dalton's passion for blackjack (and now poker) prompted him to create and maintain a blackjack and poker website providing free access to his Encyclopedia of Casino Twenty-One and public blackjack and poker forums.

In 2004, Dalton published the controversial book Blackjack Ace Prediction by David McDowell. This book received initial praise from the leading blackjack authorities until Arnold Snyder's analysis in 2005 indicated some technical problems with the strategy.

Dalton is a recipient of the NASA Exceptional Achievement Medal and a graduate of Florida Institute of Technology. He resides in Merritt Island, Florida and is married. He also enjoys playing the great highland bagpipes and performing with the City of Melbourne Pipes and Drums and the Space Coast Highlanders. Dalton has a 2nd degree black belt in Tae Kwon Do and retired in 2009 after 31 years with the National Aeronautics and Space Administration.

== Books by Michael Dalton ==
- Encyclopedia of Casino Twenty-One
- Blackjack: A Professional Reference
