= James Dalton (footballer) =

Irish footballer

Personal information
- Full name: James Joseph Dalton
- Date of birth: 1864
- Place of birth: Ireland
- Position: Full-back

Senior career*
Years	Team	Apps	(Gls)
1884–1885	Clitheroe Olympic		
1885–1886	Clitheroe Town		
1886–1890	Low Moor		
1890–1891	Pawtucket Free Wanderers		
1891	Canadian Touring Team		
1891–1894	Sunderland	3	(0)
1894–189?	Nelson		
- * Club domestic league appearances and goals

James Joseph Dalton (born 1864) was an Irish professional footballer who played as a full-back for Sunderland.
