= Michael Dalton (footballer) =

Australian rules footballer

Personal information
- Full name: Michael John Dalton
- Born: 23 May 1875; Bacchus Marsh, Victoria
- Died: 12 July 1933 (aged 58); Ballarat, Victoria
- Original team: Melbourne Juniors

Playing career^{1}
Years	Club	Games (Goals)
1899	St Kilda	1 (0)
- ^{1} Playing statistics correct to the end of 1899.

Michael John Dalton (23 May 1875 – 12 July 1933) was an Australian rules footballer who played with St Kilda in the Victorian Football League (VFL).
