= John Dalton (divine) =

John Dalton (1814–1874) was an English Roman Catholic priest.

== Life ==
Dalton was of Irish parentage, and passed the early years of his life at Coventry. He received his education at Sedgley Park School, and transferred in 1830 to St Mary's College, Oscott, where he was ordained priest. He was engaged in the missions at Northampton, Norwich, and King's Lynn, and became a member of the chapter of the diocese of Northampton.

From 1858 he was for a time at St Alban's College, Valladolid. After his return from Spain he settled at St. John's Maddermarket, Norwich, where he spent the remainder of his days, with the exception of a brief interval in 1866, when Archbishop Henry Manning sent him to Spain to collect subscriptions towards the erection in London of a cathedral in memory of Cardinal Nicholas Wiseman. He died on 15 February 1874.

== Works ==
Dalton published translations from the Latin and Spanish of various devotional works, including several by Teresa of Avila. He wrote also:

- The Art of Dying Well, (1847) translated from the Latin of Robert Bellarmine.
- The Life of St. Winifrede, translated from a MS. Life of the Saint in the British Museum, with an account of some miraculous cures effected at St. Winifrede's Well, Lond. 1857.
- The Life of Cardinal Ximenez, Lond. 1860, translated from the German of Karl Josef von Hefele.
- A Pilgrimage to the Shrines of St. Teresa de Jesus at Alba de Tormes and Avila, Lond. 1873.
