= Michael Dalton (priest) =

Canadian Roman Catholic military chaplain

Michael Joseph Dalton, MBE, MC (May 5, 1902 – April 6, 2009) was a Canadian Roman Catholic military chaplain who was the most decorated RC Padre in history of Canada's military.

Dalton was ordained to the priesthood on May 21, 1932. In 1939, at the outbreak of World War II, he volunteered to join the Essex Scottish Regiment of the Canadian Army and served the regiment in England, France, Belgium, The Netherlands and Germany. Although he could have avoided front line service due to his age and position, Dalton stated that he saw it as his duty to serve.

Dalton was known to work on the front lines of military combat and often marched with his men, carrying their weapons when they grew fatigued. Dalton was known to drive his jeep, often against orders, to the front lines of combat in order to hear confessions.

Dalton was with the Essex Scottish Regiment in their role within the ill-fated Dieppe Raid. Dalton was present with the regiment when their first two attempts to land were called off, but he missed their successful third attempt to land due to a chaplain's meeting. Learning about the regiment's landing without him, Dalton demanded to be allowed to go ashore, but his request was denied. Only 44 of the 588 men who landed at Dieppe returned, the rest killed or captured. Dalton took the responsibility of notifying the families of the dead.

In the 1943 King's Birthday Honours, Dalton became the first Catholic priest to be appointed Member of the Order of the British Empire. The award was given to him by King George VI. The city of Windsor named Dalton as the Veteran of the Year and Citizen of the Year in 1967, while the City of London, Ontario created a "Father Dalton Drive" to honor his military record.

Father Dalton continued to say the Mass until his death. At the time of his death, a month shy of his 107th birthday, Dalton was believed to have been the oldest Catholic priest in Canada and Canada's oldest surviving serviceman from World War II.
