= Jack Dalton (footballer, born 1876) =

Australian rules footballer (1876–1923)

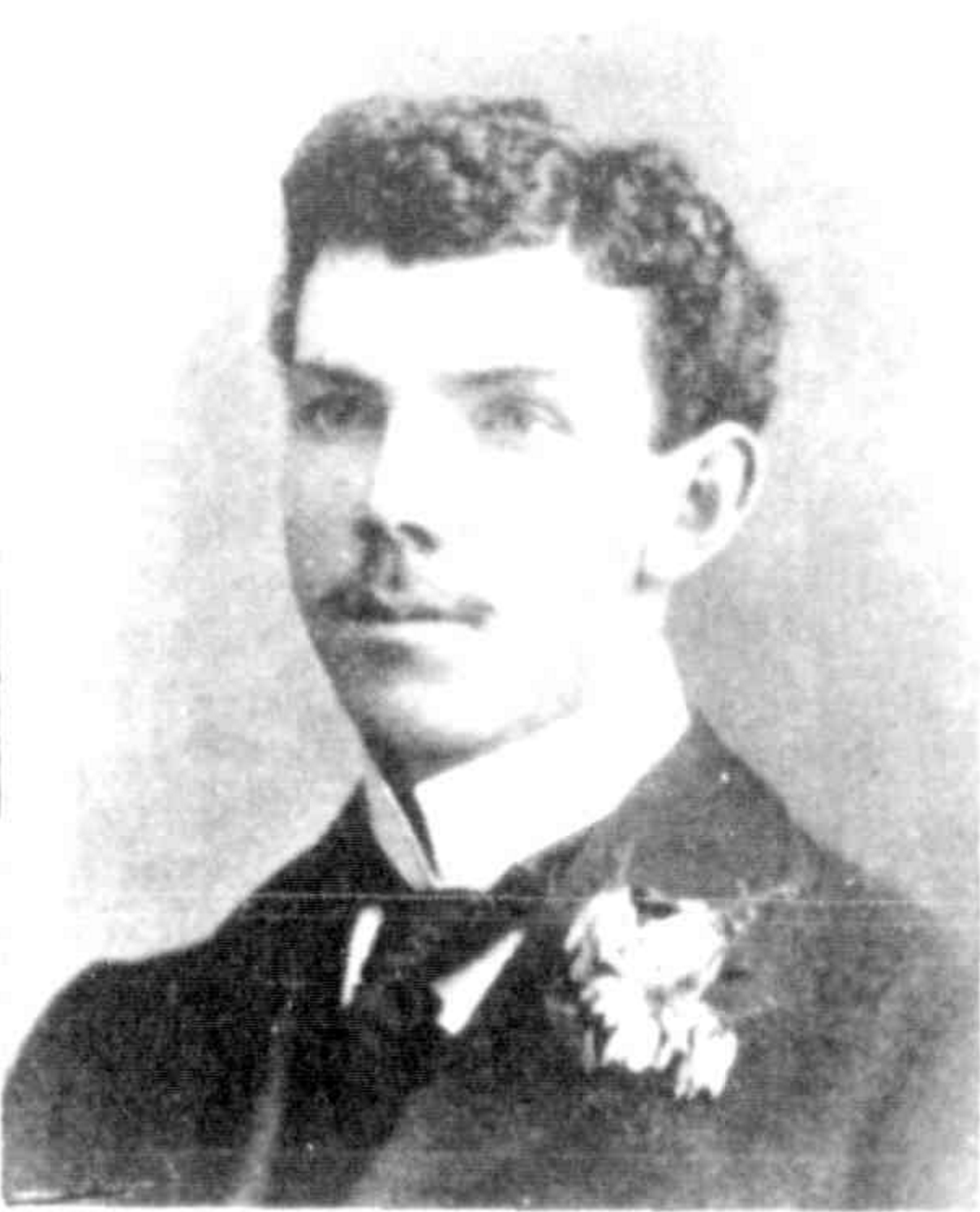
- Dalton in 1899

Personal information
- Full name: John George Dalton
- Born: 15 April 1876; Prahran, Victoria
- Died: 8 March 1923 (aged 46); Sandringham, Victoria
- Original team: Fitzroy Juniors

Playing career^{1}
Years	Club	Games (Goals)
1896	Fitzroy (VFA)	17 (0)
1897–1900	Fitzroy	44 (0)
- ^{1} Playing statistics correct to the end of 1900.

Career highlights
- VFL premiership player: 1898

John George Dalton (15 April 1876 – 8 March 1923), better known as Jack Dalton, was an Australian rules footballer who played for the Fitzroy Football Club in the Victorian Football League (VFL).

== Family ==
The son of John James Dalton (1849–1890), and Margaret Dalton (1857–1902), née Manning, John George Dalton was born at Prahran, Victoria on 15 April 1876.

He married Clare Margaret O'Neill (1883–1940) in 1912. They had two children.

== Football ==
Making his senior debut in 1896, the year before the inaugural VFL season, Dalton was a half back flanker in Fitzroy's 1898 VFL premiership team. He missed out on Fitzroy's premiership the following season due to injury.

== Death ==
He died at Sandringham, Victoria on 8 March 1923.
