= Robin Hill =

Robin Hill may refer to:

== People ==
- Robin Hill (biochemist) (1899–1991), British plant biochemist
- Robin Hill, 8th Marquess of Downshire (1929–2003), Irish peer
- Robin Hill (Australian artist) (1932–2026), Australian artist
- Robin Hill (American artist) (born 1955), American visual artist

== Places ==
- Robin Hill, New South Wales, Australia
- Robin Hill Country Park, Downend, Isle of Wight, UK
- Robin Hill Cemetery, Marlborough, Massachusetts, USA

=== In fiction ===
- Robin Hill, an important location in the fictional milieu of John Galsworthy's series The Forsyte Saga
