= Henry S. Dennison =

American business man

Henry Sturgis Dennison
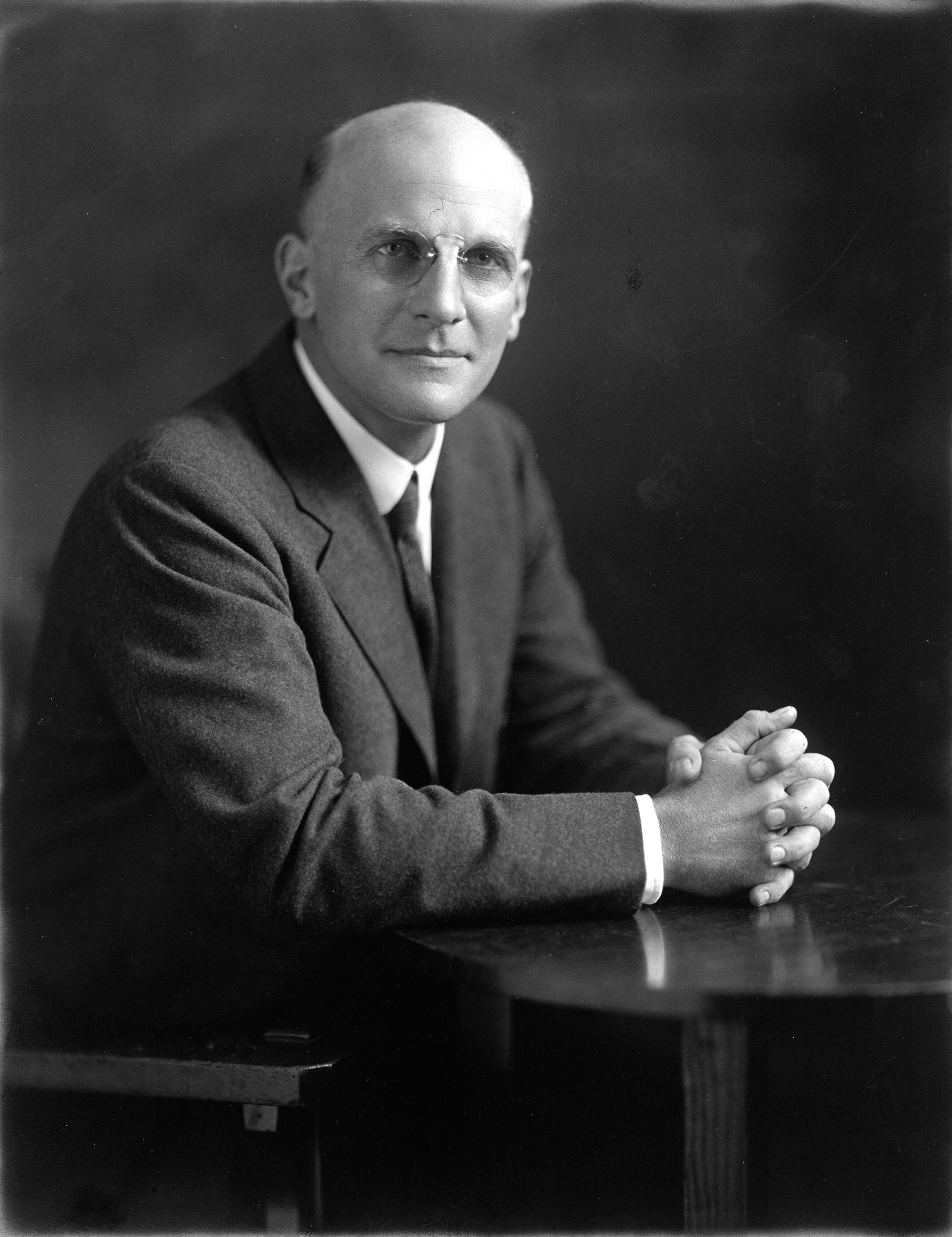
- Portrait of Henry S. Dennison, c. 1928
- Born: March 4, 1877; Boston, Massachusetts
- Died: February 29, 1952 (aged 74)
- Citizenship: American
- Occupations: president and owner
- Employer: Dennison Manufacturing Co. Paper Box Factory
- Notable credit(s): President Taylor Society, 1919–21

Henry Sturgis Dennison (March 4, 1877 – February 29, 1952) was an American progressive business man, president and owner of Dennison Manufacturing Co. Paper Box Factory, economic analyst, and organizational theorist. He was president of the Taylor Society from 1919 to 1921, and recipient of the Henry Laurence Gantt Medal in 1932.

== Biography ==
=== Youth, education and career ===
Born in Boston, Massachusetts, Dennison was the son of Henry Beals Dennison and Emma Stanley Dennison. His grandfather Andrew Dennison was founding president of Dennison Manufacturing Co. Paper Box Factory in 1844, and his father had followed in his footsteps. After regular education Dennison graduated from Harvard College in 1899.

After his graduation Dennison entered the family business in 1899, where he was promoted to works manager in 1906. From 1917 to 1942 he was president of the company, realizing a steady growth of the company.

=== Other activities, honours and death ===
Besides his work at the Dennison Manufacturing Co., Dennison was active member in several organizations, lectured at Harvard Business School, and authored several books and articles.

Dennison participated in the Taylor Society, where he was president from 1919 to 1921 as successor of John E. Otterson. In 1921 he was succeeded by Henry P. Kendall. Dennison also served as director of the American Management Association, and as president of the Boston Chamber of Commerce, the National Resources Planning Board, and the Business Research Council. He was also industrial advisor to the administrations of Woodrow Wilson and Franklin D. Roosevelt.

in 1932 Dennison was awarded the Henry Laurence Gantt Medal by the American Management Association and the ASME, and the Taylor Key Award by the Society for Advancement of Management in 1940.

Dennison died in 1952 in Framingham, Massachusetts.

== Work ==
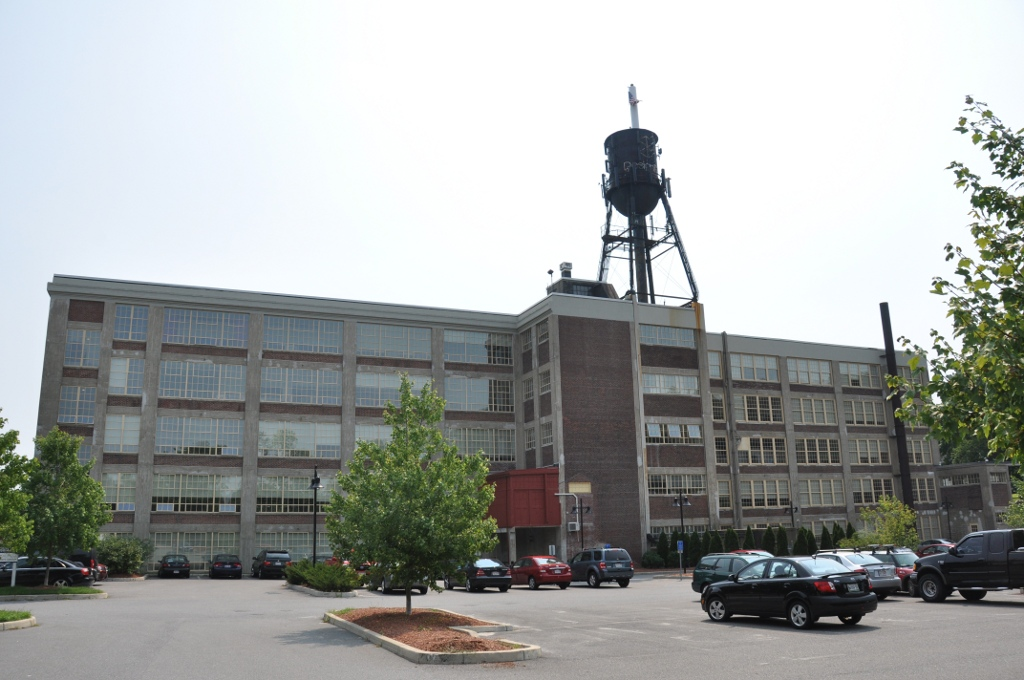
Former Dennison Manufacturing Co. Paper Box Factory.

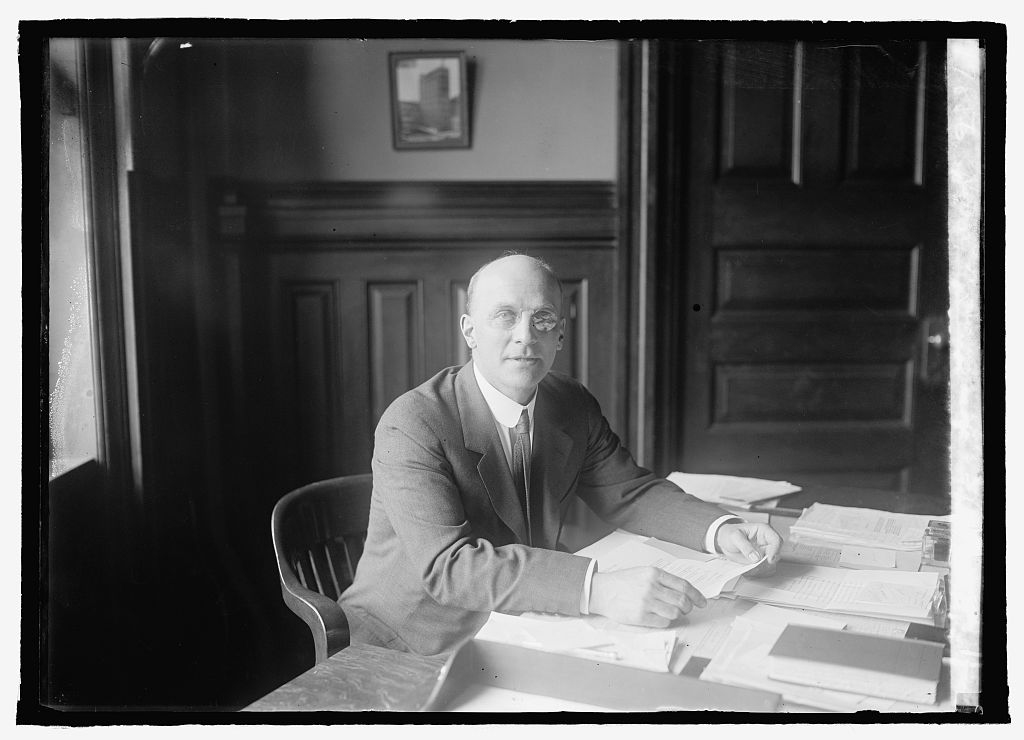
Henry S. Dennison, 1922

Dennison had a specific interest in the theories of scientific management and as president of Dennison Manufacturing Company initiated several reforms in line with those insights. These included "an unemployment fund, a reduction in working hours, non-managerial profit-sharing and the establishment of health and personnel services. "

== Publications ==
- Henry S. Dennison. E.W. Dennison : a memorial. Boston : Merrymount Press, 1909.
- Burritt, A. W., Dennison, H. S., Gay, E. F., Heilman, R. E., & Kendall, H. P. Profit sharing, its principles and practice: A collaboration. Harper & brothers, 1918.
- Henry S. Dennison. The psychological foundations of management, 1927.
- Henry S. Dennison. Organization engineering. New York: McGraw Hill, 1931.
- Stanley B. Mathewson. With chapters by William M. Leiserson, Henry S. Dennison and Arthur E. Morgan. Restriction of output among unorganized workers, New York : Viking Press, 1931.
- Henry S. Dennison. Ethics and modern business, 1932.
- Henry S. Dennison, et al. Toward full employment. New York : Whittlesey House, McGraw-Hill, 1938.
- John Kenneth Galbraith & Henry S. Dennison. Modern Competition and Business Policy, 1938.

Articles, a selection

- Dennison, Henry S. "Management and the Business Cycle." Journal of the American Statistical Association 18.137 (1922): 20-32.
- Dennison, Henry S. "The Need for the Development of Political Science Engineering." American Political Science Review 26.02 (1932): 241-255.

Publications about Henry S. Dennison

- James T. Dennison. Henry S. Dennison, 1877-1952: New England industrialist who served America, No. 187. Newcomen Society in North America, 1955.
- Kim McQuaid, "Henry S. Dennison and the" Science" of Industrial Reform, 1900-1950." American Journal of Economics and Sociology (1977): 79-98.
- Kyle Bruce, "Henry S. Dennison, Elton Mayo, and Human Relations historiography." Management & Organizational History 2006, 1: 177–199.
