= West Main Street Historic District (Marlborough, Massachusetts) =

Historic district in Massachusetts, United States

- U.S. National Register of Historic Places
- U.S. Historic district
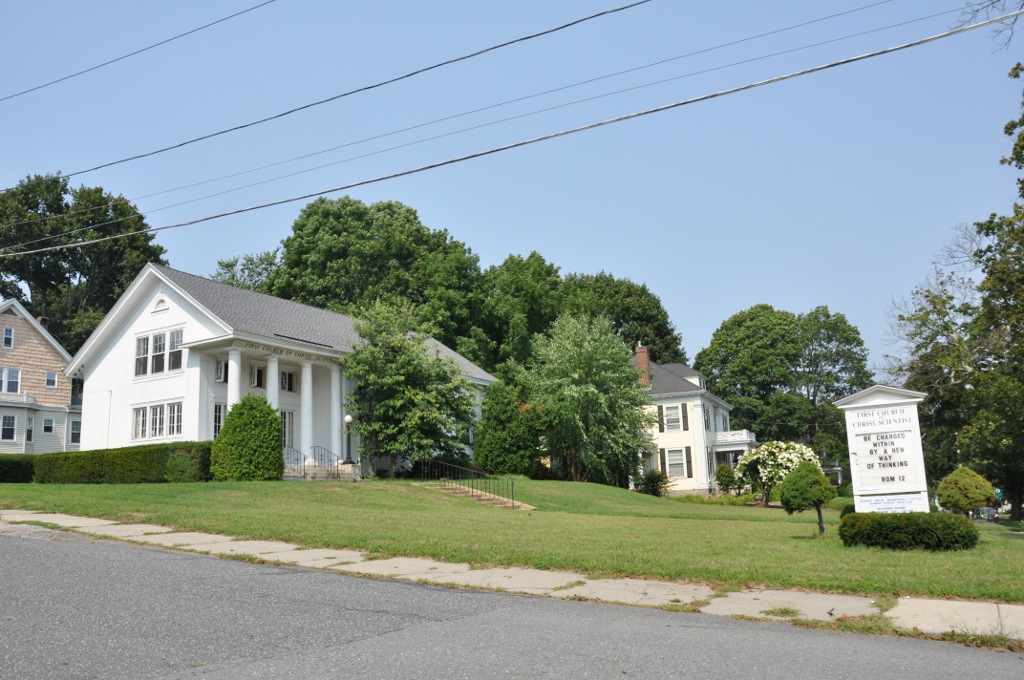

- Location within Massachusetts Location within the United States
- Location: West Main, Pleasant, Winthrop and Wetherbee Sts., Marlborough, Massachusetts
- Coordinates: 42°20′39″N 71°33′27″W
- Area: 15 acres (6.1 ha)
- Architectural style: Queen Anne, Colonial Revival, et al.
- NRHP reference No.: 01001215
- Added to NRHP: November 08, 2001

The West Main Street Historic District of Marlborough, Massachusetts encompasses a residential area west of the city center. It extends along West Main Street from Mechanic Street to Gibbon Street, along Pleasant Street from West Main to Lincoln Street, and also includes short pieces of Witherbee and Winthrop Streets abutting West Main. Most of the buildings in the district are houses built between 1820 and 1930, the period of the city's growth as an industrial center. The 15-acre (6.1 ha) district includes 77 properties, all but two of which contribute to its historic significance. The district was listed on the National Register of Historic Places in 2001.

== Description and history ==
The city of Marlborough developed as a small industrial city during the 19th century, with industry, business, and commerce focused in its downtown area. To the west of the downtown a residential area developed that followed a typical pattern for industrializing cities. The upper-class owners, managers, and merchants built high-quality housing on well-proportioned lots on major streets near the centers of commerce and industry, while lower-class workers and functionaries lived in more modest and densely packed areas. In Marlborough West Main Street and Pleasant Street were two major roads along which the finer houses were built, set back on lots with manicured lawns. Typical examples in this district include the Italianate Brigham-Cutting House (c. 1876–77)at 22 Pleasant Street, the Greek Revival William Pitt Brigham House (c. 1858) at 28 Pleasant Street, and the Queen Anne Stevens House (c. 1885) at 32 Pleasant. The latter two houses were both owned around the turn of the 20th century by factory owners.

The houses along Witherbee and Winthrop Street are in slightly smaller lots. Larger houses in this area were built and occupied by skilled workers, and many of them have since been subdivided into multiple units. Typical examples include the Second Empire George A. Howe House (c. 1870) at 59 Witherbee Street, the Bungalow-style Kelley House (c. 1915) at 17 Winthrop Street, and the Georgian Revival Ellis House (c. 1920) at 14 Winthrop.

There are two major non-residential buildings in the district. The Christian Science Church (corner of West Main and Winthrop) is a residential-scale structure built in 1920, while the St. Mary's Credit Union Building (135 West Main) is an ahistoric oversized Colonial Revival structure that does not contribute to the area's historic significance.

== See also ==
- National Register of Historic Places listings in Marlborough, Massachusetts
