= Warren Block =

Warren Block may refer to:

- Warren Block (Westbrook, Maine), listed on the National Register of Historic Places in Cumberland County, Maine
- Warren Block (Marlborough, Massachusetts), listed on the National Register of Historic Places in Middlesex County, Massachusetts
