= John Cotting House =

Historic house in Massachusetts, United States

- U.S. National Register of Historic Places
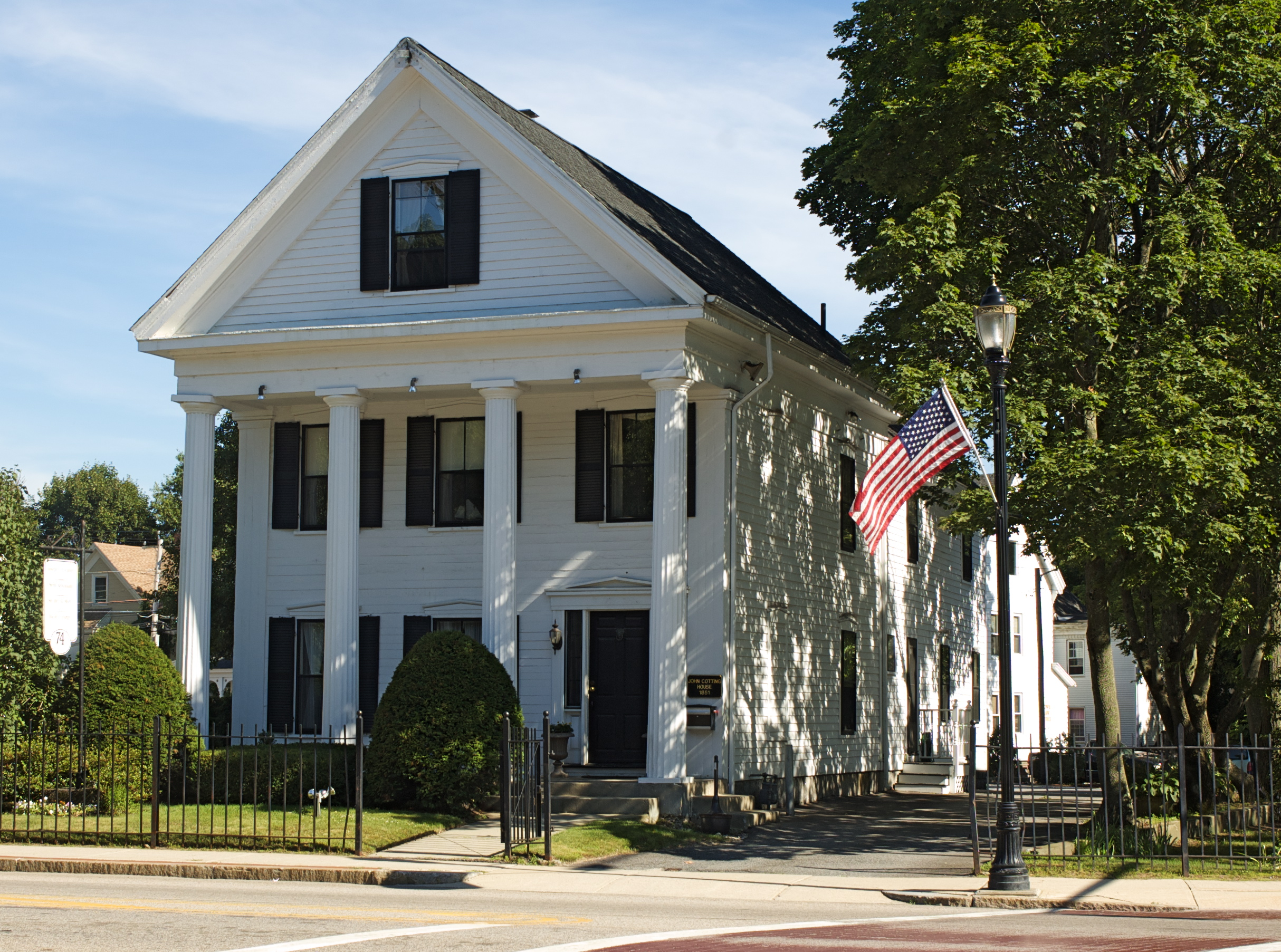

- Location within Massachusetts Location within the United States
- Location: Marlborough, Massachusetts
- Coordinates: 42°20′49″N 71°32′46″W
- Built: 1851
- Architectural style: Greek Revival
- NRHP reference No.: 84002556
- Added to NRHP: August 16, 1984

The John Cotting House is a historic house at 74 Main Street in Marlborough, Massachusetts.

== Description and history ==
The two story wood-frame house was built c. 1851, and is one of the city's few temple-front Greek Revival houses. John Cotting was the son of Amos Cotting, a doctor, and operated a tavern nearby. In the 20th century it was used by the local chapter of the Knights of Columbus.

The house was listed on the National Register of Historic Places on August 16, 1984. It is currently the location for the law offices of Stephen G. Morte, Joseph J. Connolly, and Sem Aykanian.

== See also ==
- National Register of Historic Places listings in Marlborough, Massachusetts
