= Pleasant Street Historic District (Marlborough, Massachusetts) =

Historic district in Massachusetts, United States

- U.S. National Register of Historic Places
- U.S. Historic district
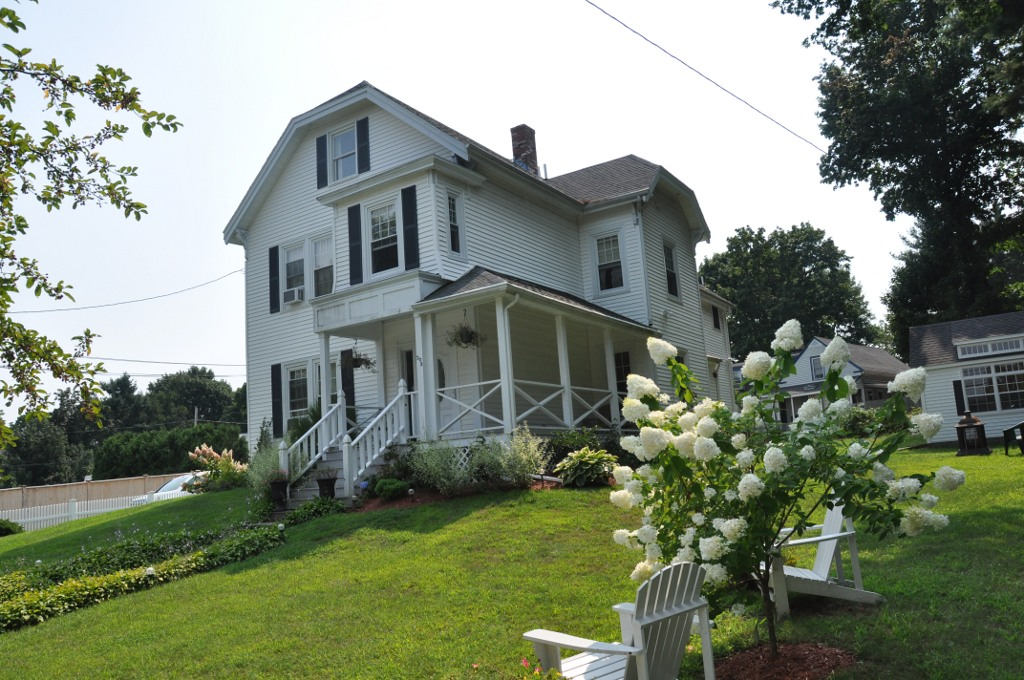

- Location within Massachusetts Location within the United States
- Location: Marlborough, Massachusetts
- Coordinates: 42°20′59″N 71°33′49″W
- Area: 8.3 acres (3.4 ha)
- Architectural style: Second Empire, Colonial Revival
- NRHP reference No.: 01001061
- Added to NRHP: September 27, 2001

The Pleasant Street Historic District is a predominantly residential historic district at 187—235 Pleasant Street in Marlborough, Massachusetts. It is a cohesive collection of 8 residences and one school building that are representative of upper class housing on large well-proportioned lots. The oldest house in the district was built c. 1865, the newest c. 1924. A number of 19th century houses were restyled during the 1920s. The Immaculate Conception School was built in 1961, and does not contribute to the area's historic significance. The district was added to the National Register of Historic Places in 2001.

The Pleasant Street area was developed as an upper-class residential area for leaders in Marlborough's dominant shoe manufacturing industry. Members of the Howe and Frye families contributed several of the houses. Louis Howe, who began manufacturing shoes in 1850, built a substantial Second Empire house at 207 Pleasant c. 1865, which was updated to the Colonial Revival by his nephew in the 1920s. Louis Howe's cousin Franklin built 207 Pleasant c. 1872; it was a companion Second Empire house, which was given Georgian Revival styling in 1927 by John Frye, who grew up next door.

Three other houses were built in the 19th century, all with Queen Anne styling. The Russell House at 208 Pleasant was built c. 1885, and has a wraparound porch and bargeboard decoration in its gables. This house, like several of the others in the district, has been converted to multi-unit housing. The Walter Frye House at 187 Pleasant was built c. 1895, and has characteristic Queen Anne features, with numerous projections and gables, as well as a wraparound porch with octagonal pavilion and porte cochere. The Frye-Hazelton House at 223 Pleasant was also built c. 1895, and features a prominent octagonal tower.

== See also ==
- National Register of Historic Places listings in Marlborough, Massachusetts
