= Spring Hill Cemetery (Marlborough, Massachusetts) =

Historic site in Middlesex County, Massachusetts, US

- U.S. National Register of Historic Places
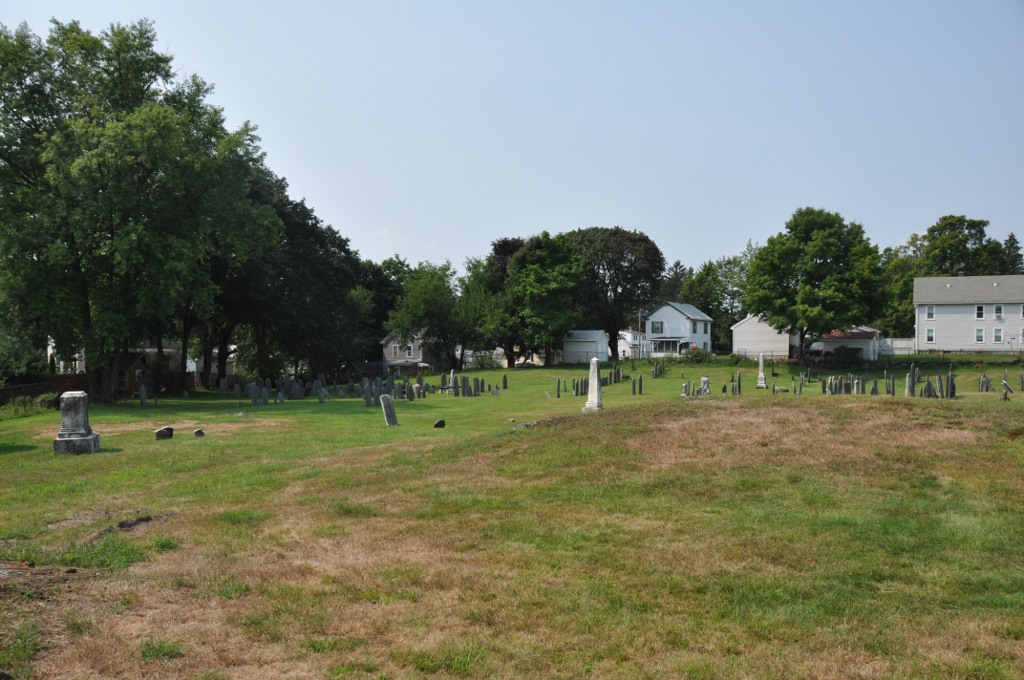

- Location within Massachusetts Location within the United States
- Location: Marlborough, Massachusetts
- Coordinates: 42°20′53″N 71°32′35″W
- Area: 2.62 acres (1.06 ha)
- NRHP reference No.: 04001114
- Added to NRHP: October 6, 2004

Spring Hill Cemetery is a historic cemetery at High and Brown Streets in Marlborough, Massachusetts. Established in 1675, it is the city's oldest cemetery. It has about 650 known burials, dating from its establishment to 1977. It is located on a 2.62-acre (1.06 ha) parcel on a hill just east of the downtown area, and is accessed via a single entrance marked by granite posts at High and Brown Streets. Burials are laid out generally in rows, with headstones facing west. There are four earth-covered tombs near the entrance dating to the first half of the 19th century. Another prominent burial is that of Marlborough's first minister, William Brimsmead (d. 1701).

The cemetery was added to the National Register of Historic Places in 2004.

== See also ==
- National Register of Historic Places listings in Marlborough, Massachusetts
