= Temple Building (Marlborough, Massachusetts) =

- U.S. National Register of Historic Places
- U.S. Historic district – Contributing property
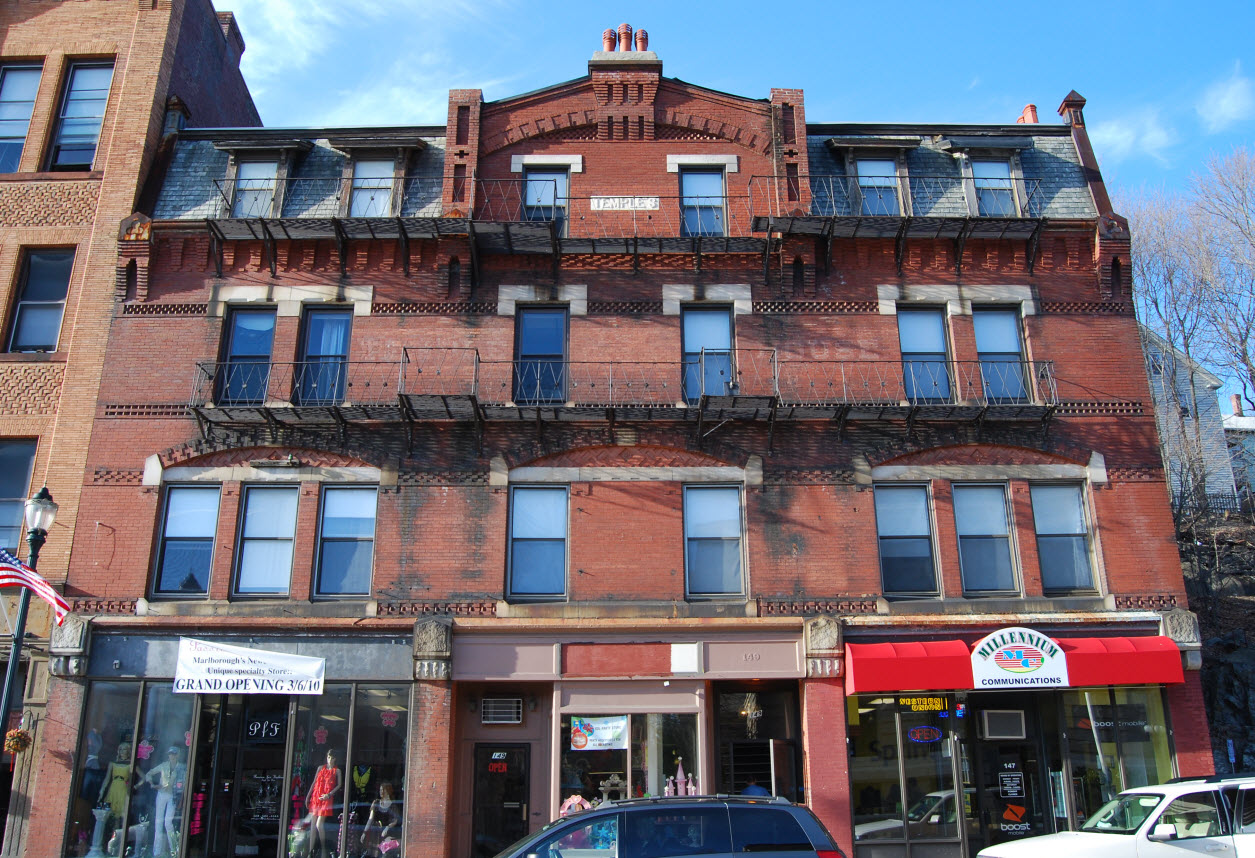

- Location within Massachusetts Location within the United States
- Location: Marlborough, Massachusetts
- Coordinates: 42°20′49″N 71°32′56″W
- Built: 1879
- Architectural style: Queen Anne
- Part of: Marlborough Center Historic District (ID98000992)
- NRHP reference No.: 83000830

Significant dates
- Added to NRHP: March 10, 1983
- Designated CP: August 19, 1998

The Temple Building is a historic commercial and residential building at 149 Main Street in Marlborough, Massachusetts. The four story red brick building was built in 1879–80, and originally housed shops on the ground floor and a hotel on the upper floors. It still has shop space on the ground floor, but the upper levels have been converted to apartments. The building has Second Empire styling, with a mansard roof that is punctured at the center of the main facade by a two-bay arched projecting with decorative brickwork.

The building was listed on the National Register of Historic Places in 1983.

== See also ==
- National Register of Historic Places listings in Marlborough, Massachusetts
