= Marlborough City Hall (Massachusetts) =

Seat of city government of Marlborough, Massachusetts, USA

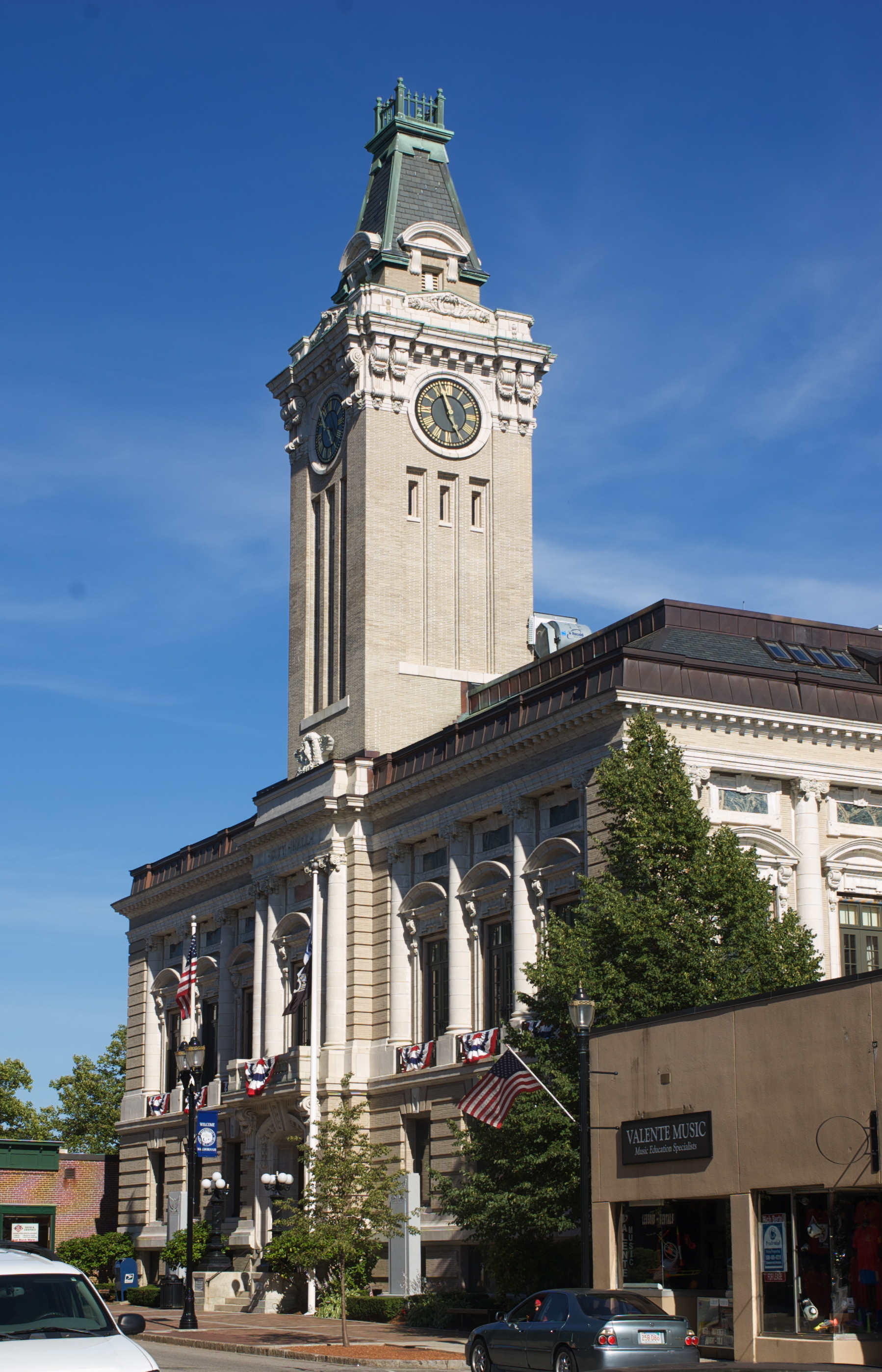
- Marlborough City Hall
- Interactive map of the Marlborough City Hall area

General information
- Architectural style: Beaux-Arts
- Location: 140 Main Street; Marlborough, Massachusetts, U.S.
- Coordinates: 42°20′52″N 71°32′59″W
- Completed: 1905

Technical details
- Floor count: 4

Design and construction
- Architects: Allen, Collens & Berry

Website
- Official website

Marlborough City Hall is the seat of city government of Marlborough, Massachusetts. It includes the offices of the mayor of Marlborough and the Marlborough City Council. The current city hall building was built in 1905 by architects Allen, Collens and Berry and is an example of Beaux-Arts architecture. It replaced an earlier building that burned down in 1902. The building is part of the Marlborough Center Historic District.

== Background ==
In 1902, Marlborough's Town Hall was destroyed by fire, prompting the city to build a new structure as its replacement. The new building, built by architects Allen, Collens and Berry, was constructed with buff Roman brick and marble trim.

== Public transportation ==
MetroWest Regional Transit Authority (MWRTA) Route 7C (Inner City Marlborough) line runs roughly east–west through Marlborough. This route runs through the downtown Marlborough and connects multiple Shopping Complexes/Malls, residential localities and Marlborough Hospital. Transfers can be made between routes 7 and 7C at the Marlborough City Hall stop.
