= Brigham Cemetery =

Historic cemetery in Middlesex County, Massachusetts, US

- U.S. National Register of Historic Places
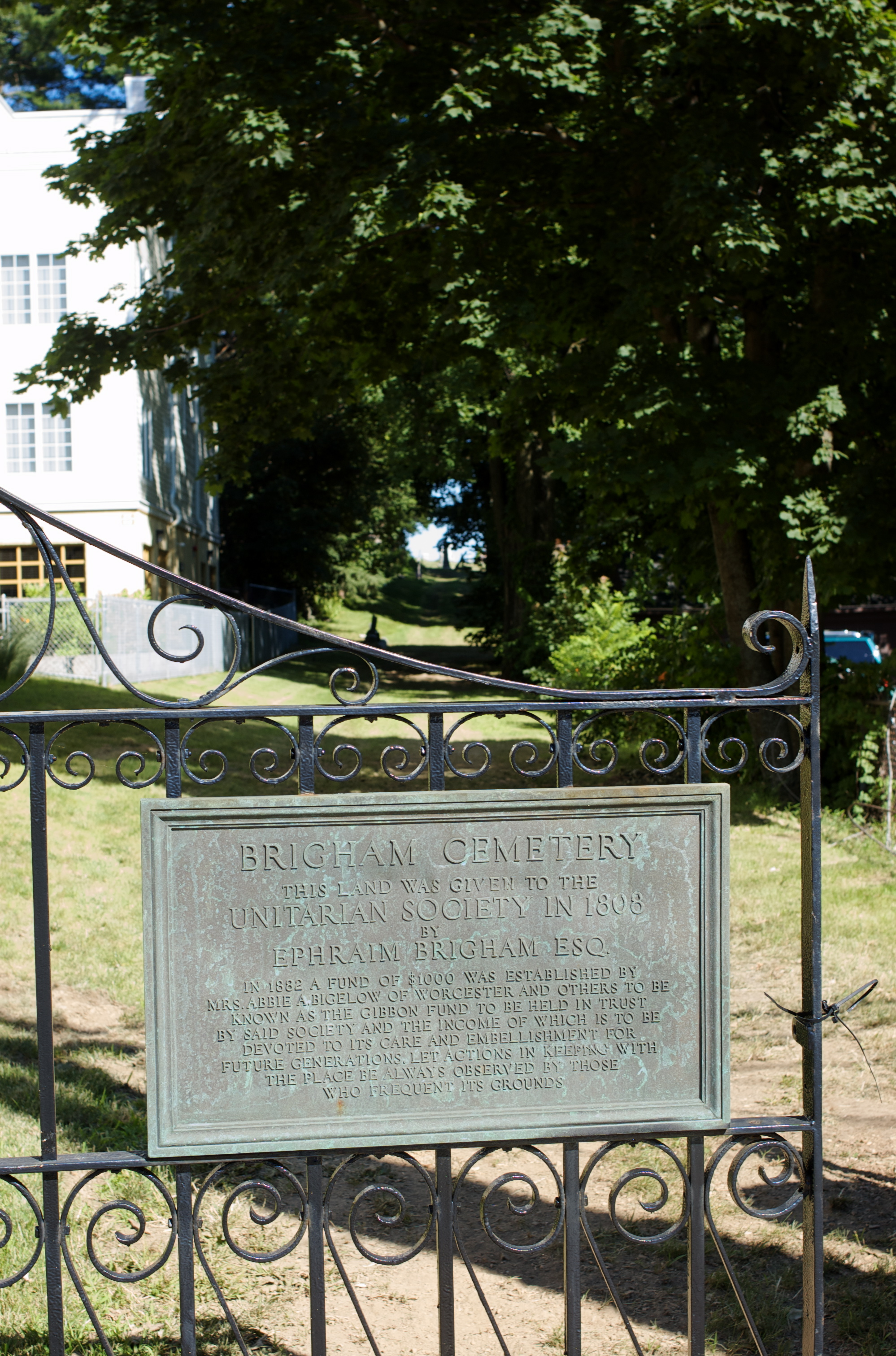

- Location within Massachusetts Location within the United States
- Location: Marlborough, Massachusetts
- Coordinates: 42°20′30″N 71°33′36″W
- Area: 1.12 acres (0.45 ha)
- NRHP reference No.: 04000933
- Added to NRHP: September 10, 2004

Brigham Cemetery is a historic cemetery off West Main Street near Crescent Street in Marlborough, Massachusetts. The small cemetery's first burial was in 1793, and is significant as the city's burial ground for early victims of smallpox. Its burials also include veterans of the American Revolutionary War and the American Civil War. The cemetery was listed on the National Register of Historic Places in 2004. Its last burial was in 1934.

== Description and history ==
Brigham Cemetery is located west of downtown Marlborough and south of West Main Street, behind a row of houses. It is accessed via a narrow lane between two of the houses marked by an iron gate with granite posts. A placard on the gate identifies the cemetery. It is bounded on the south and east by two Catholic cemeteries. The cemetery is a little over 1 acre (0.40 ha) in size, with graves arrayed in rough rows facing west. The parcel is sloped, with the area at the northwest corner terraced. There are no formal plantings or circulation paths. There are 71 burial plots, including individual and family sites, with a more than 200 documented burials.

The cemetery was established in 1793; its first burials were of William and Lydia Brigham, victims of smallpox, who were refused burial in the town's other cemeteries. It remained in the Brigham family until 1808, when it was given to the local Unitarian Society. It was taken over by the town in 1855, and was used for burials until 1934. It is the city's fourth municipal cemetery, and one of its smallest. There are 19 documented burials of Revolutionary War veterans and seven from the Civil War.

== See also ==
- National Register of Historic Places listings in Marlborough, Massachusetts
