= National Register of Historic Places listings in Marlborough, Massachusetts =

List of Registered Historic Places in Marlborough, Massachusetts
This National Park Service list is complete through NPS recent listings posted March 13, 2026.

== Marlborough ==
| | Name on the Register | Image | Date listed | Location | Description |
|---|---|---|---|---|---|
| 1 | Brigham Cemetery | Brigham Cemetery | September 10, 2004 (#04000933) | off W. Main St. near Crescent St. 42°20′30″N 71°33′36″W | |
| 2 | John Cotting House | John Cotting House | August 16, 1984 (#84002556) | 74 Main St. 42°20′49″N 71°32′46″W | |
| 3 | Dennison Manufacturing Co. Paper Box Factory | Dennison Manufacturing Co. Paper Box Factory | November 19, 2008 (#08001070) | 175 Maple St. 42°20′29″N 71°32′36″W | |
| 4 | Maplewood Cemetery | Maplewood Cemetery | September 29, 2004 (#04001082) | Pleasant St. 42°21′13″N 71°33′49″W | |
| 5 | Marlborough Brook Filter Beds | Marlborough Brook Filter Beds | January 18, 1990 (#89002286) | Framingham Rd. 42°19′47″N 71°32′09″W | Extends into Southborough, Worcester County. |
| 6 | Marlborough Center Historic District | Marlborough Center Historic District | August 19, 1998 (#98000992) | Roughly bounded by MA 85, Granger Blvd., Mechanic St., Central St., and Washington St. 42°20′52″N 71°32′59″W | |
| 7 | Pleasant Street Historic District | Pleasant Street Historic District | September 27, 2001 (#01001061) | 187-235 Pleasant St. 42°20′59″N 71°33′49″W | |
| 8 | Capt. Peter Rice House | Capt. Peter Rice House | April 9, 1980 (#80000641) | 377 Elm St. 42°20′51″N 71°34′30″W | |
| 9 | Robin Hill Cemetery | Robin Hill Cemetery | September 29, 2004 (#04001083) | Donald Lynch Blvd. 42°21′52″N 71°35′42″W | |
| 10 | Rocklawn Cemetery | Rocklawn Cemetery | October 6, 2004 (#04001115) | Stevens St. 42°21′10″N 71°32′27″W | |
| 11 | Spring Hill Cemetery | Spring Hill Cemetery | October 6, 2004 (#04001114) | High and Brown Sts. 42°20′53″N 71°32′34″W | |
| 12 | Temple Building | Temple Building | March 10, 1983 (#83000830) | 149 Main St. 42°20′49″N 71°32′56″W | |
| 13 | Wachusett Aqueduct Linear District | Wachusett Aqueduct Linear District | January 18, 1990 (#89002276) | Along Wachusett Aqueduct from Wachusett Reservoir to Sudbury Reservoir; 42°20′01″N 71°35′27″W | |
| 14 | Warren Block | Warren Block | March 10, 1983 (#83000836) | 155 Main St. 42°20′49″N 71°32′56″W | |
| 15 | Weeks Cemetery | Weeks Cemetery | September 10, 2004 (#04000934) | Corner of Sudbury St. and Concord Rd. 42°22′23″N 71°29′53″W | |
| 16 | West Main Street Historic District | West Main Street Historic District | November 8, 2001 (#01001215) | West Main, Pleasant, Winthrop and Witherbee Sts. 42°20′39″N 71°33′27″W | |
| 17 | Wilson Cemetery | Wilson Cemetery | September 10, 2004 (#04000958) | Wilson St. 42°21′09″N 71°30′29″W | |
