= Capt. Peter Rice House =

Historic house in Massachusetts, United States

- U.S. National Register of Historic Places
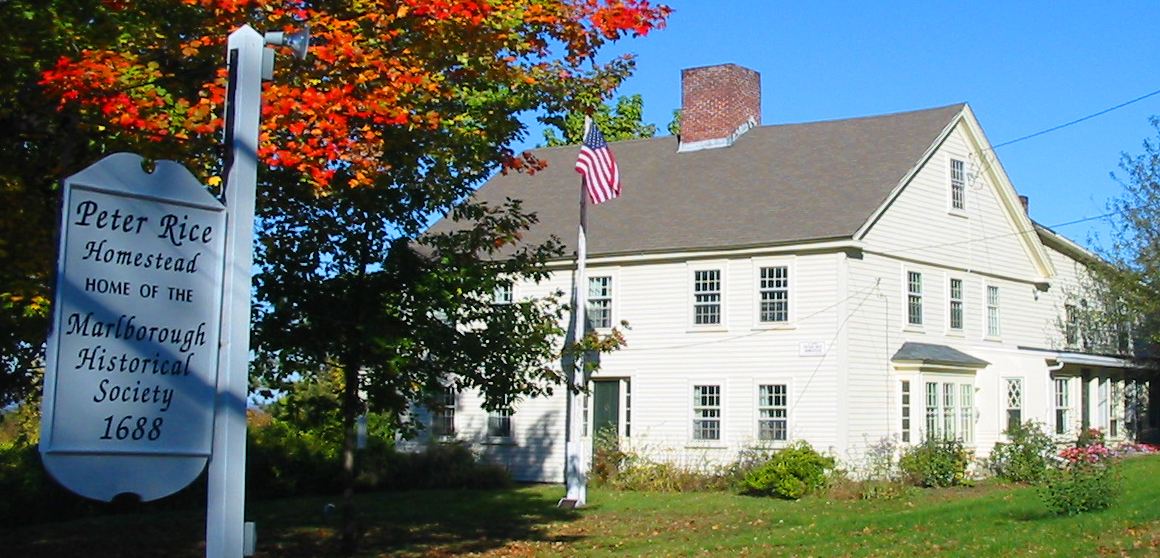

- Location within Massachusetts Location within the United States
- Location: Marlborough, Massachusetts
- Coordinates: 42°20′51″N 71°34′30″W
- Built: 1688
- NRHP reference No.: 80000641
- Added to NRHP: April 9, 1980

The Capt. Peter Rice House is a historic First Period house at 377 Elm Street in Marlborough, Massachusetts. The oldest portion of this house, a two-room section, dates to 1688, and was built by Peter Rice around the time of his marriage to Rebecca Howe. It was expanded over the 18th century to its present configuration, a five-bay 2 1/2-story saltbox with a large central chimney. The house now serves as the headquarters of the Marlborough Historical Society.

The house was added to the National Register of Historic Places in 1980.

== See also ==
- List of the oldest buildings in Massachusetts
- National Register of Historic Places listings in Marlborough, Massachusetts
