= Wilson Cemetery =

Historic cemetery in Massachusetts, United States

- U.S. National Register of Historic Places
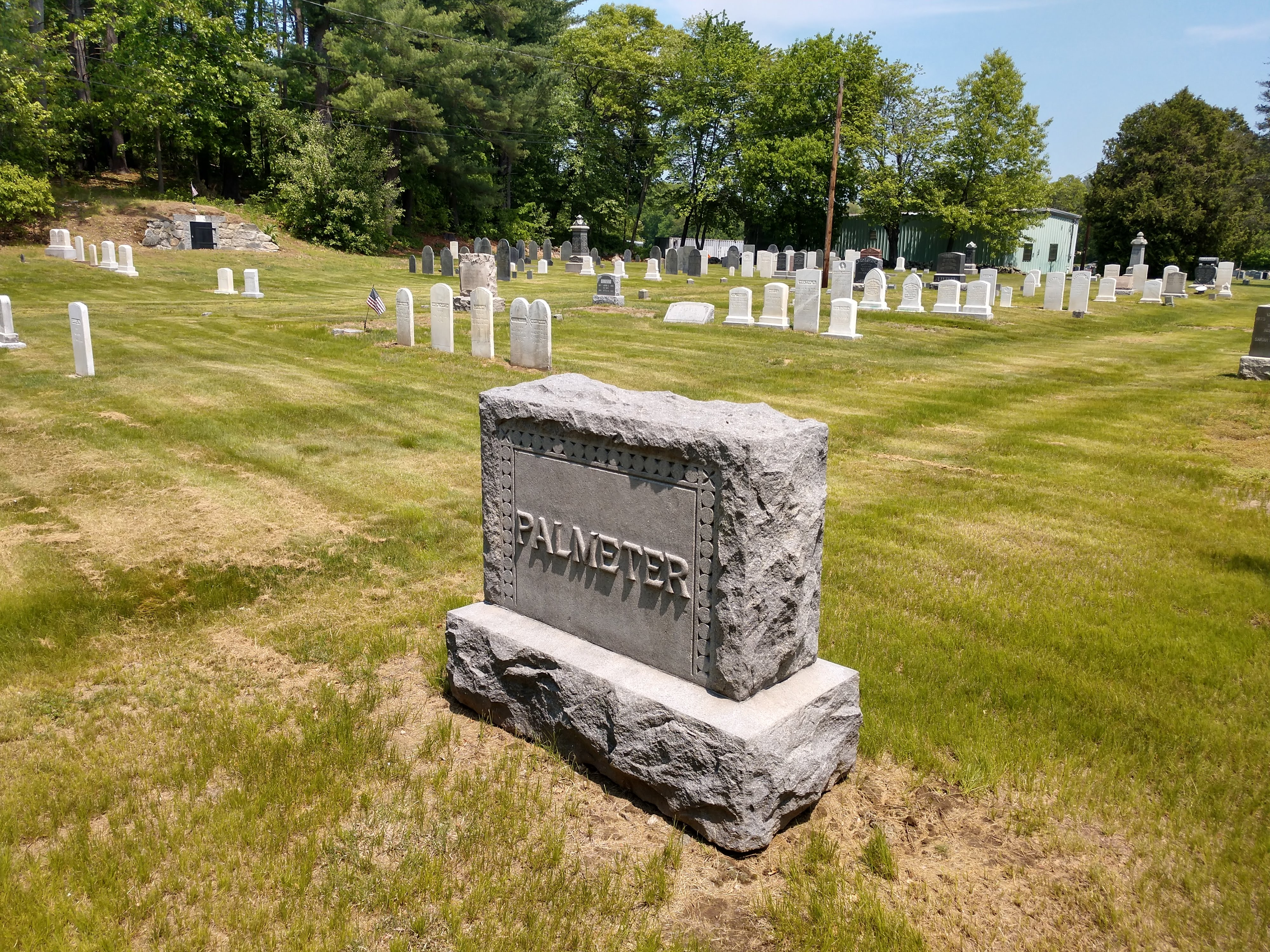

- Location within Massachusetts Location within the United States
- Location: Wilson St., Marlborough, Massachusetts
- Coordinates: 42°21′9″N 71°30′29″W
- Area: 1.22 acres (0.49 ha)
- NRHP reference No.: 04000958
- Added to NRHP: September 10, 2004

Wilson Cemetery is a historic cemetery at Wilson Street on Marlborough, Massachusetts. The cemetery is a 1.22 acres (0.49 ha) parcel that is usually accessed via the adjacent Evergreen Cemetery. Wilson Cemetery was established in 1764, and contains marked graves dating between 1764 and 2000. Most of the burials date to the 19th century. The older portion of the cemetery is to the north, where graves are arrayed in rough north–south rows. A central pathway separates this section from the southern portion, which is laid out in a more formal rectilinear grid. The most prominent burial is the tomb of Robert Eames, a veteran of the American Revolutionary War.

The cemetery was listed on the National Register of Historic Places in 2004.

== See also ==
- National Register of Historic Places listings in Marlborough, Massachusetts
