= Rocklawn Cemetery =

Historic cemetery in Massachusetts, United States

- U.S. National Register of Historic Places
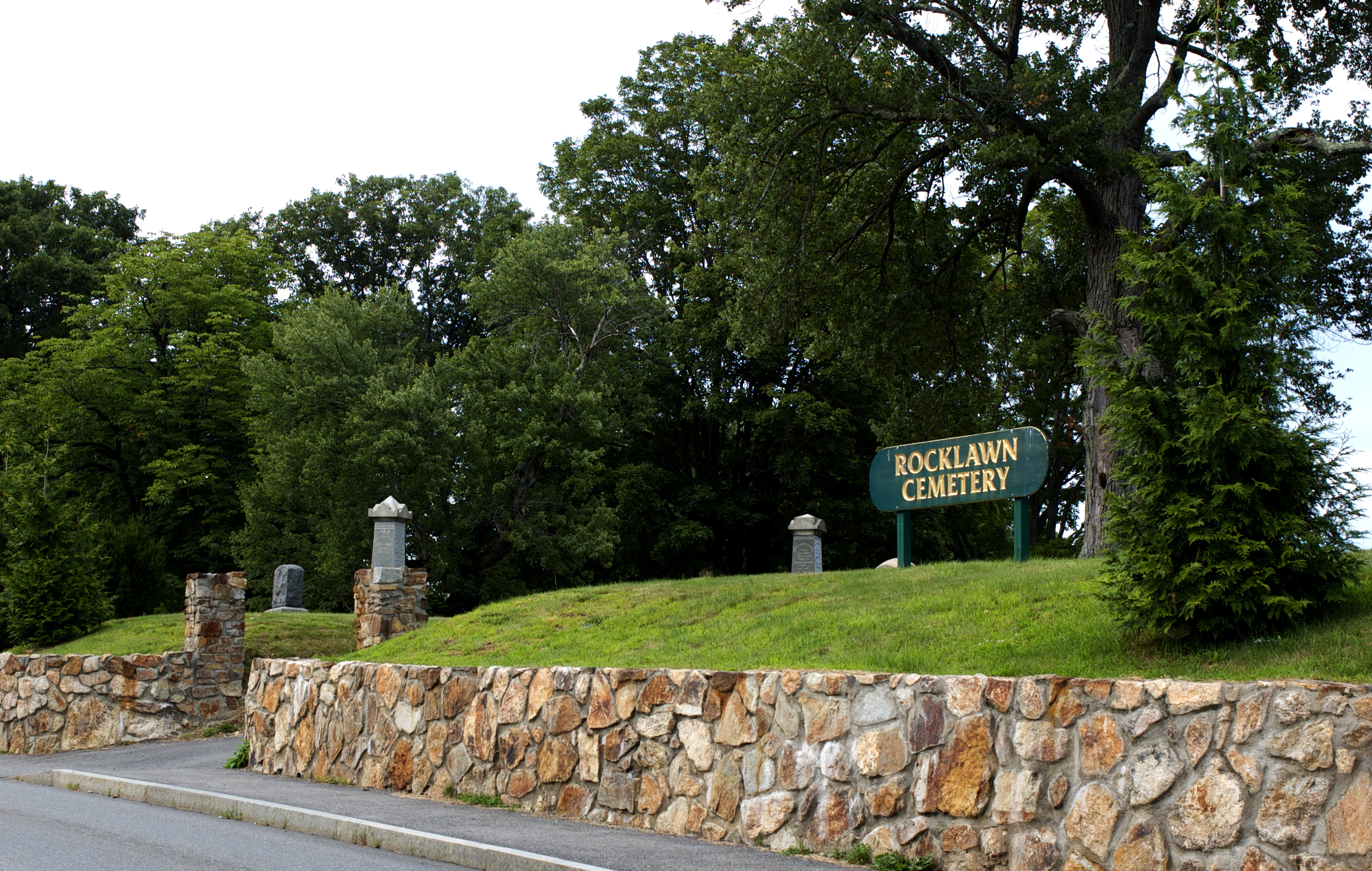

- Location within Massachusetts Location within the United States
- Location: Marlborough, Massachusetts
- Coordinates: 42°21′10″N 71°32′27″W
- Area: 5 acres (2.0 ha)
- Built: 1865
- Architectural style: Gothic Revival
- NRHP reference No.: 04001115
- Added to NRHP: October 6, 2004

Rocklawn Cemetery is a historic cemetery on Stevens Street in Marlborough, Massachusetts. Established in 1813 as Chipman Cemetery, it was Marlborough's fifth cemetery. The Rocklawn section of the cemetery was added in 1855, giving the cemetery its present name. This section was laid out in the then-fashionable rural cemetery style, in contrast to the older section, which is laid out in a grid. The cemetery served as a major burying ground for the city from the mid-19th century into the 20th century.

The cemetery was listed on the National Register of Historic Places in 2004.

== See also ==
- National Register of Historic Places listings in Marlborough, Massachusetts
