= Maplewood Cemetery (Marlborough, Massachusetts) =

Historic cemetery in Massachusetts, United States

- U.S. National Register of Historic Places
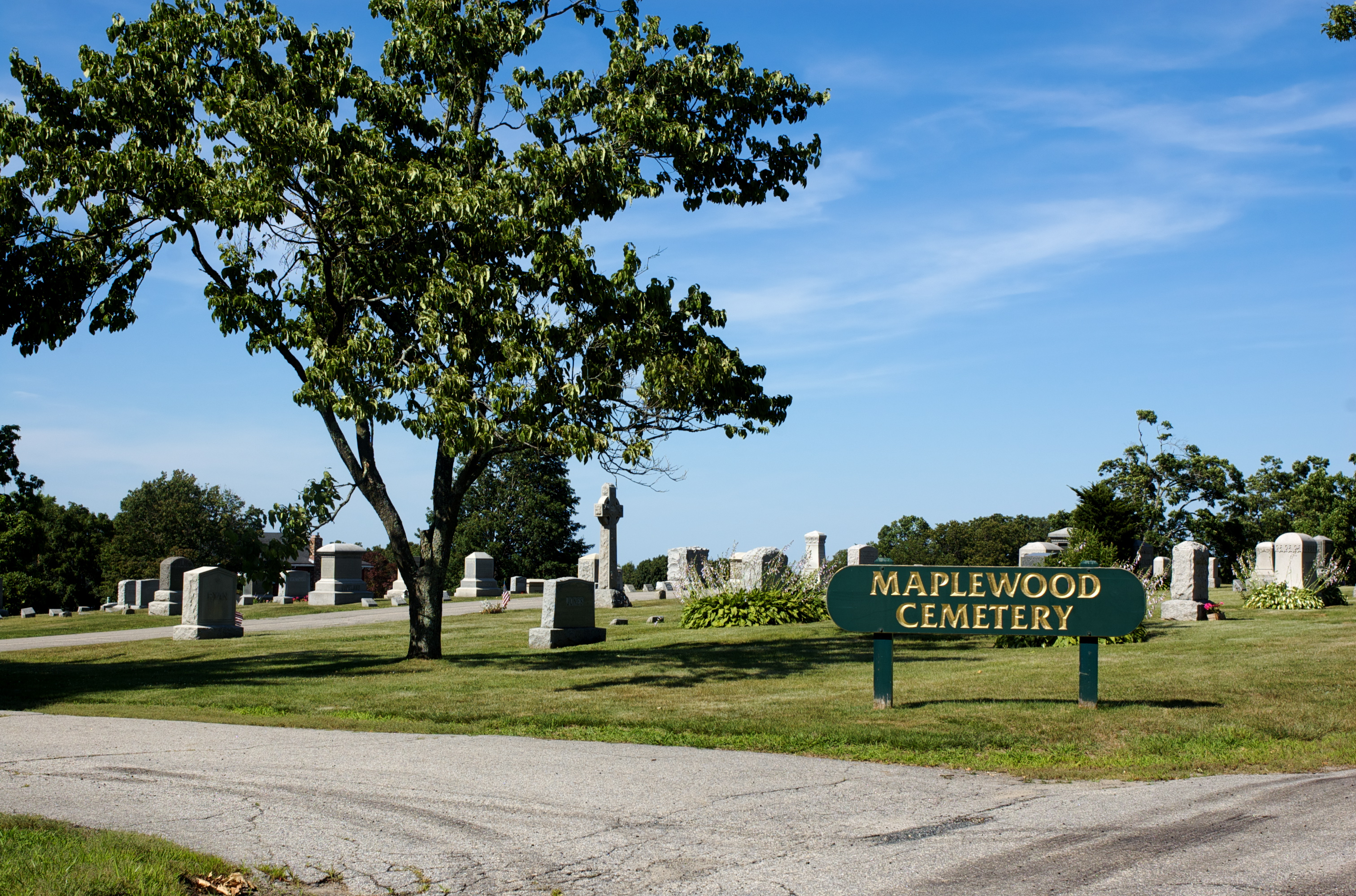

- Location within Massachusetts Location within the United States
- Location: Marlborough, Massachusetts
- Coordinates: 42°21′13″N 71°33′49″W
- Area: 15 acres (6.1 ha)
- Built: 1864
- Architectural style: Gothic Revival
- NRHP reference No.: 04001082
- Added to NRHP: September 29, 2004

Maplewood Cemetery is a historic cemetery on Pleasant Street in Marlborough, Massachusetts. Established in 1864, the 15-acre (6.1 ha) cemetery is the city's eighth. It is laid out in a roughly rectilinear manner, departing from the popular rural cemetery movement, which preferred more picturesque but less space-efficient winding paths and roads. It is the location of a Civil War memorial, placed by the Daughters of the American Revolution.

The cemetery was listed on the National Register of Historic Places in 2004.

== See also ==
- National Register of Historic Places listings in Marlborough, Massachusetts
