= Dennison Manufacturing Co. Paper Box Factory =

- Dennison Manufacturing Co.. Paper Box Factory
- U.S. National Register of Historic Places
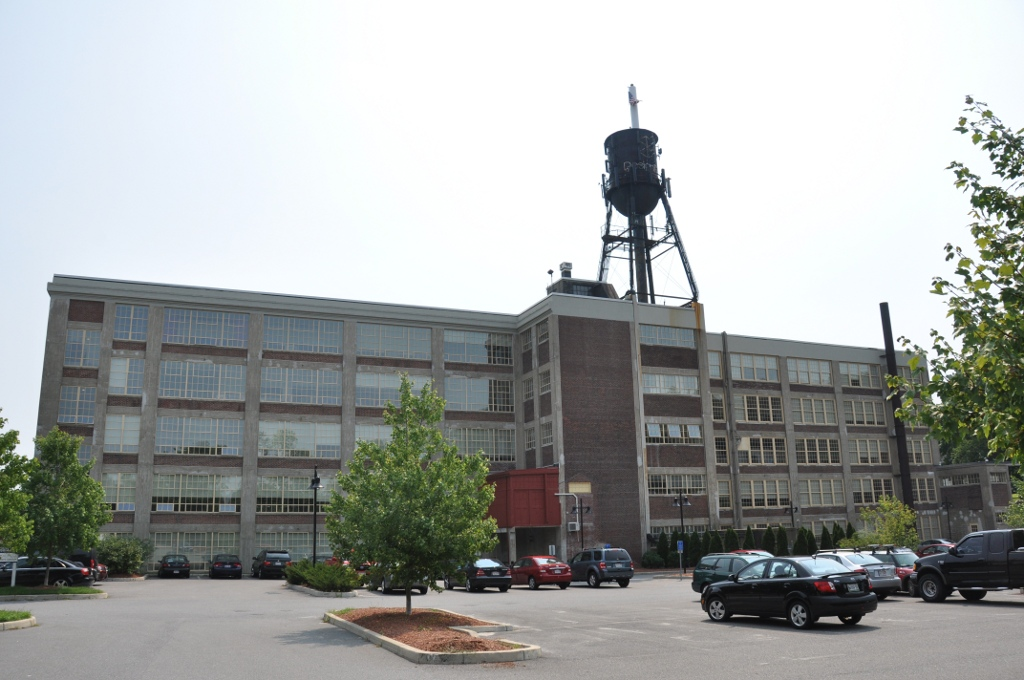

- Location within Massachusetts Location within the United States
- Location: 175 Maple St., Marlborough, Massachusetts
- Coordinates: 42°20′27″N 71°32′37″W
- Area: 2.8 acres (1.1 ha)
- Built: 1923
- Architect: Monks & Johnson
- Architectural style: Early Commercial
- NRHP reference No.: 08001070
- Added to NRHP: November 19, 2008

The Dennison Manufacturing Co. Paper Box Factory is a historic factory building at 175 Maple Street in Marlborough, Massachusetts.

It was built in 1923 and owned by the paper company until 1969. After Dennison left, a subsidiary of Dennison, Design Pak, was based in the building. In 2007, the building was converted into apartments. The building was added to the National Register of Historic Places in 2008.

Dennison, founded by brothers Aaron and Eliphalet W. Dennison as an adjunct to their father's jewelry business, was originally a jewelry-box making company run out of the family home in Brunswick, Maine, in the 1840s.

== See also ==
- National Register of Historic Places listings in Marlborough, Massachusetts
