= Marlborough Country Club =

Country club in Marlborough, Massachusetts

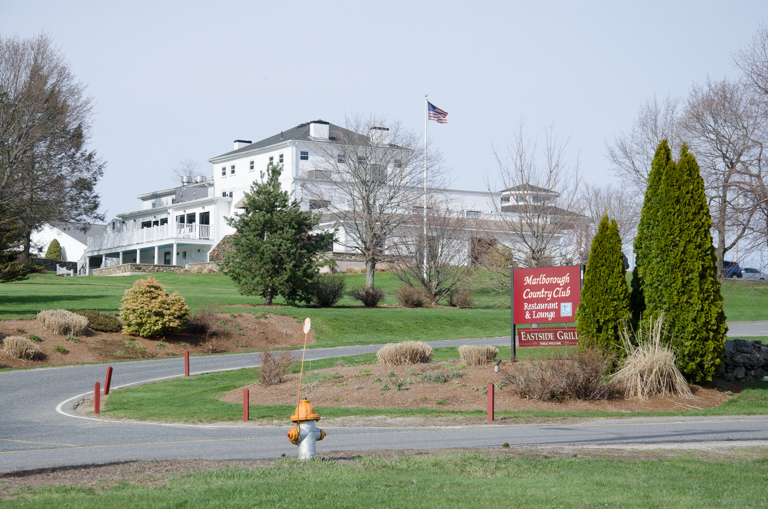
- The Marlborough Country Club building in Marlborough, Massachusetts.

- Location within Massachusetts
- 42°21′24.1″N 71°31′24.4″W

Club information
- Location: Marlborough, Massachusetts, U.S.
- Type: Semi-private
- Total holes: 18
- Website: www.marlboroughcc.com
- Designed by: Wayne E. Styles

Marlborough Country Club is a semi-private country club open to the public on Mondays and Tuesdays located in Marlborough, Massachusetts, United States. The club formally opened on June 3, 1922. The feature event was a four-ball best-ball match in which Francis Ouimet and his partner Larry Paton defeated Ed Childs and Parker Schofield. Ouimet played a round in 78.

== History ==
In 1921, the current back nine at Marlborough was designed by Wayne E. Styles. In 1992, three holes at Marlborough Country Club were selected to a list of "The Most Outstanding 18 Holes" in the region by professionals in the area. They selected the 12th, 14th, and 16th holes. Especially the 16th hole because it is the hardest hole on the back nine. The front nine was designed by the team of Geoffrey Cornish and William G. Robinson in 1968.

Marlborough Country Club was host of Senior PGA Tour Event The Marlborough Classic from 1981 to 1983. Bob Goalby won the event in 1981, with Arnold Palmer winning in 1982 and Don January winning in 1983. The event has since changed locations to the Nashawtuc Country Club in Concord, Massachusetts and is now called Bank of America Championship.

== Scorecard ==
Marlborough Country Club (All measurements made in yards)
Tee	Rating/Slope	1	2	3	4	5	6	7	8	9	Out	10	11	12	13	14	15	16	17	18	In	Total
Black	M: 72.4 / 138 W: 78.8 / 145	361	443	378	344	236	380	162	538	404	3246	325	541	170	464	407	378	413	378	183	3259	6505
Blue	M: 70.2 / 137 W: 76.5 / 140	329	416	361	315	218	355	148	497	381	3020	316	520	156	447	365	359	395	370	174	3102	6122
White	M: 68.5 / 135 W: 73.8 / 134	318	398	349	294	199	333	137	478	340	2846	305	466	139	423	343	306	327	319	166	2794	5640
Red/White	M: 67.0 / 130 W: 72.2 / 132	309	388	340	287	140	333	126	478	234	2635	294	460	139	423	314	281	276	319	158	2664	5299
Red	M: 65.2 / 126 W: 70.2 / 127	309	388	340	287	140	287	126	400	234	2511	294	460	100	357	314	281	276	240	158	2480	4991
Par	Men's	4	4	4	4	3	4	3	5	4	35	4	5	3	5	4	4	4	4	3	36	71
Par	Women's	4	5	4	4	3	4	3	5	4	36	4	5	3	5	4	4	4	4	3	36	72

* Source:
