= Warren Block (Marlborough, Massachusetts) =

- U.S. National Register of Historic Places
- U.S. Historic district – Contributing property
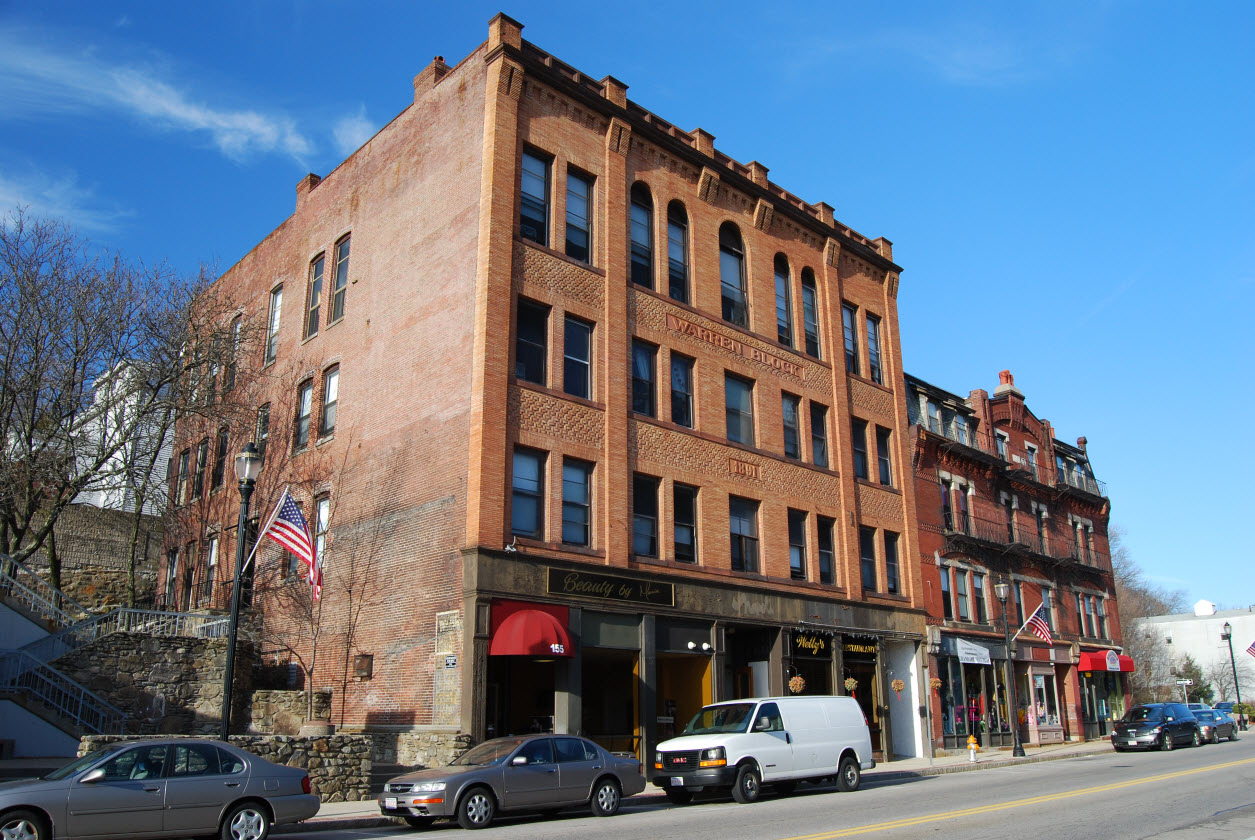

- Location within Massachusetts Location within the United States
- Location: Marlborough, Massachusetts
- Coordinates: 42°20′49″N 71°32′56″W
- Built: 1891
- Architect: Warren, Joseph E.
- Architectural style: Mixed (more Than 2 Styles From Different Periods)
- Part of: Marlborough Center Historic District (ID98000992)
- NRHP reference No.: 83000836

Significant dates
- Added to NRHP: March 10, 1983
- Designated CP: August 19, 1998

The Warren Block is a historic commercial block at 155 Main Street in Marlborough, Massachusetts. The four-story brick building was built in 1891 for Winslow Warren, owner of the local railway express. The building was designed to house office spaces on most of the first and second floors, and facilities of the local YMCA, including a gymnasium and reading room. The building's facade features a distinctive basket-weave style of brickwork.

The building was listed on the National Register of Historic Places in 1983, and included in the Marlborough Center Historic District in 1998.

== See also ==
- National Register of Historic Places listings in Marlborough, Massachusetts
