= Weeks Cemetery =

Historic cemetery in Middlesex County, Massachusetts

- U.S. National Register of Historic Places
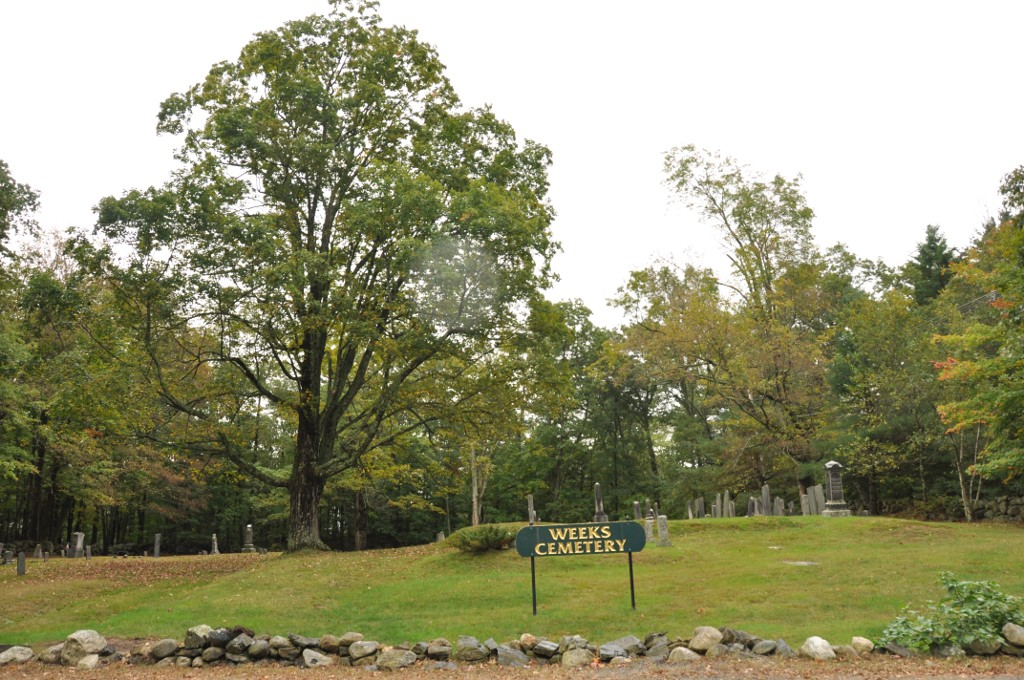

- Location within Massachusetts Location within the United States
- Location: Marlborough, Massachusetts
- Coordinates: 42°22′23″N 71°29′53″W
- NRHP reference No.: 04000934
- Added to NRHP: September 10, 2004

Weeks Cemetery is a historic cemetery at the corner of Sudbury Street and Concord Road in Marlborough, Massachusetts. The cemetery was established in 1837, as one of several neighborhood burying grounds established in the city in the first half of the 19th century. It is organized around 34 family plots, only two of which post-date 1934. More than 100 people are buried there, including in unmarked graves. It is bounded by a typical New England fieldstone wall that probably dates to early in the cemetery's history.

The cemetery was listed on the National Register of Historic Places in 2004.

== See also ==
- National Register of Historic Places listings in Marlborough, Massachusetts
