= Management & Organizational History =

- Discipline: Management studies
- Language: English
- Edited by: Michael Rowlinson, Roy Stager Jacques

Publication details
- History: 2006-present
- Publisher: SAGE Publications
- Impact factor: 0.6 (2022)

Standard abbreviations
- ISO 4: Manag. Organ. Hist.

Indexing
- ISSN: 1744-9359 (print); 1744-9367 (web)
- LCCN: 2006211721
- OCLC no.: 300298239

Links
- Journal homepage; Online access; Online archive

Management & Organizational History is a peer-reviewed academic journal that publishes papers five times a year in the field of management studies, especially with regard to historical approaches to the study of management, organizations and organizing. Its editors-in-chief are Michael Rowlinson (Queen Mary, University of London) and Roy Stager Jacques (Massey University). It was established in 2006 and is currently published by SAGE Publications.

== Abstracting and indexing ==
Management and Organizational History is abstracted and indexed in Scopus.
