= Robin Hill, New South Wales =

Robin Hill New South Wales
- Coordinates: 33°25′31″S 149°32′42″E
- Population: 925 (2016 census)
- LGA(s): Bathurst Region
- State electorate(s): Bathurst
- Federal division(s): Calare

Robin Hill is a suburb of Bathurst, New South Wales, Australia, in the Bathurst Region.
