= Robin Hill Cemetery =

Historic cemetery in Middlesex County, Massachusetts

- U.S. National Register of Historic Places
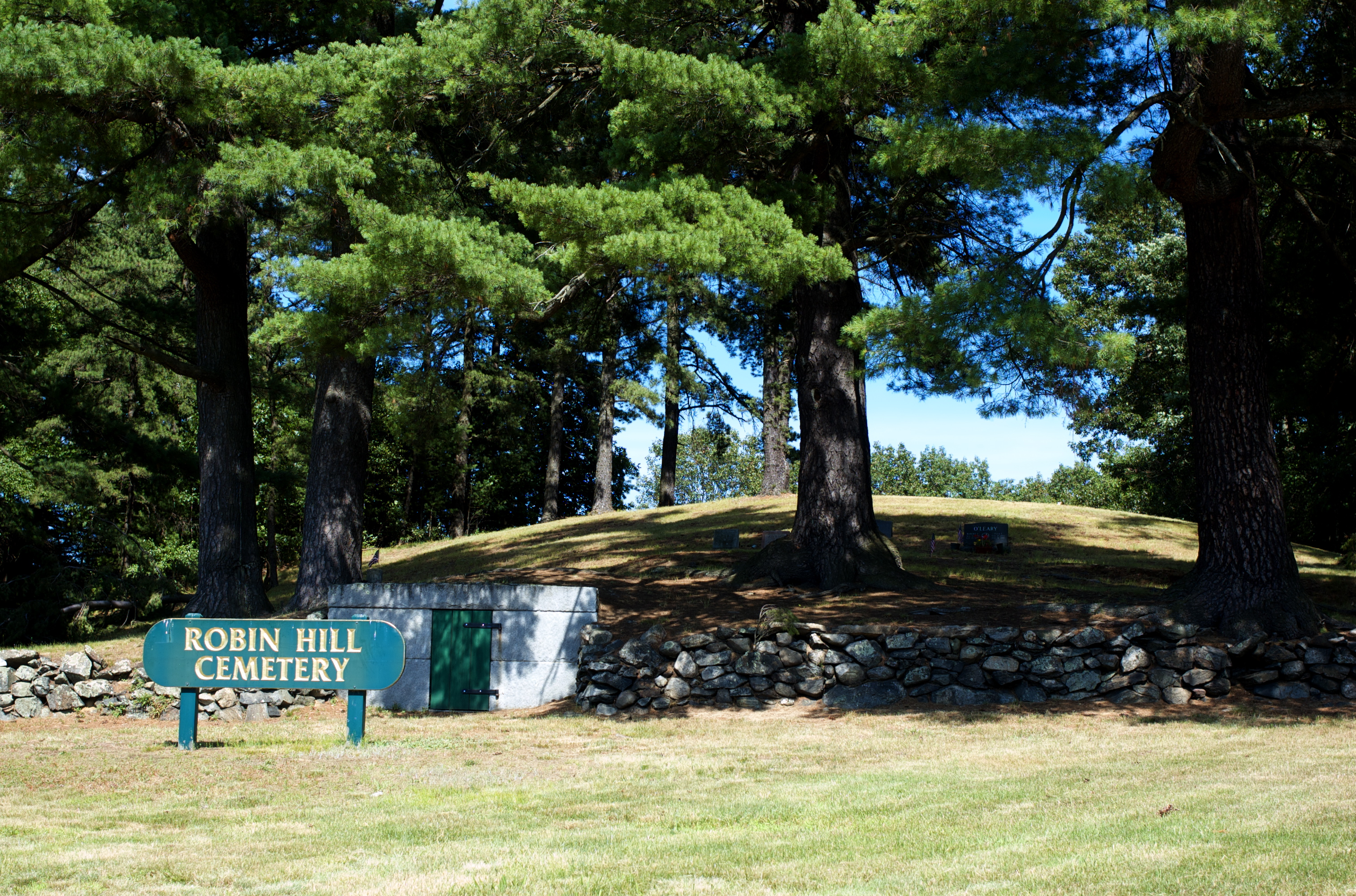

- Location within Massachusetts Location within the United States
- Location: Marlborough, Massachusetts
- Coordinates: 42°21′52″N 71°35′42″W
- Area: 1 acre (0.40 ha)
- NRHP reference No.: 04001083
- Added to NRHP: September 29, 2004

Robin Hill Cemetery is a historic cemetery on Donald Lynch Boulevard in Marlborough, Massachusetts, overlooking the Assabet River. It is approximately 1 acre (0.40 ha), the community's second smallest burial ground. As of 2004, it had 24 markers denoting 27 burials. It is located on the South Side of Donald Lynch Boulevard in a commercial office park, with the interchange between Interstates 495 and 290 to its south and east. Part of the property is taken up by Robin Hill, a rise of about 30 feet (9.1 m) that is mostly covered with pine trees and has relatively few burials. The rest of the property is relatively flat and has been divided into family plots measuring about 20 by 20 feet (6.1 m × 6.1 m). A receiving tomb, which probably originates from the mid-19th century, is located on the property.

When established in the early 19th century, Robin Hill Cemetery was located in a relatively rural agricultural area. Its burials include several military veterans, including those from the American Revolutionary War, the American Civil War, and World War II. Although the cemetery is still in active use, most of the marked graves date to the third quarter of the nineteenth century. The markers speak towards the high frequency of childhood death, as demonstrated by the dual markers for the two sons of Levi and Lucinda Rice, aged four and six, who both died on the same day in December 1817, while also demonstrating for families longevity, such as Ananias Cooke, who died in 1851 at the age of 91.

The cemetery was listed on the National Register of Historic Places in 2004.

== See also ==
- National Register of Historic Places listings in Marlborough, Massachusetts
