= Marlborough Center Historic District =

Historic district in Massachusetts, United States

- U.S. National Register of Historic Places
- U.S. Historic district
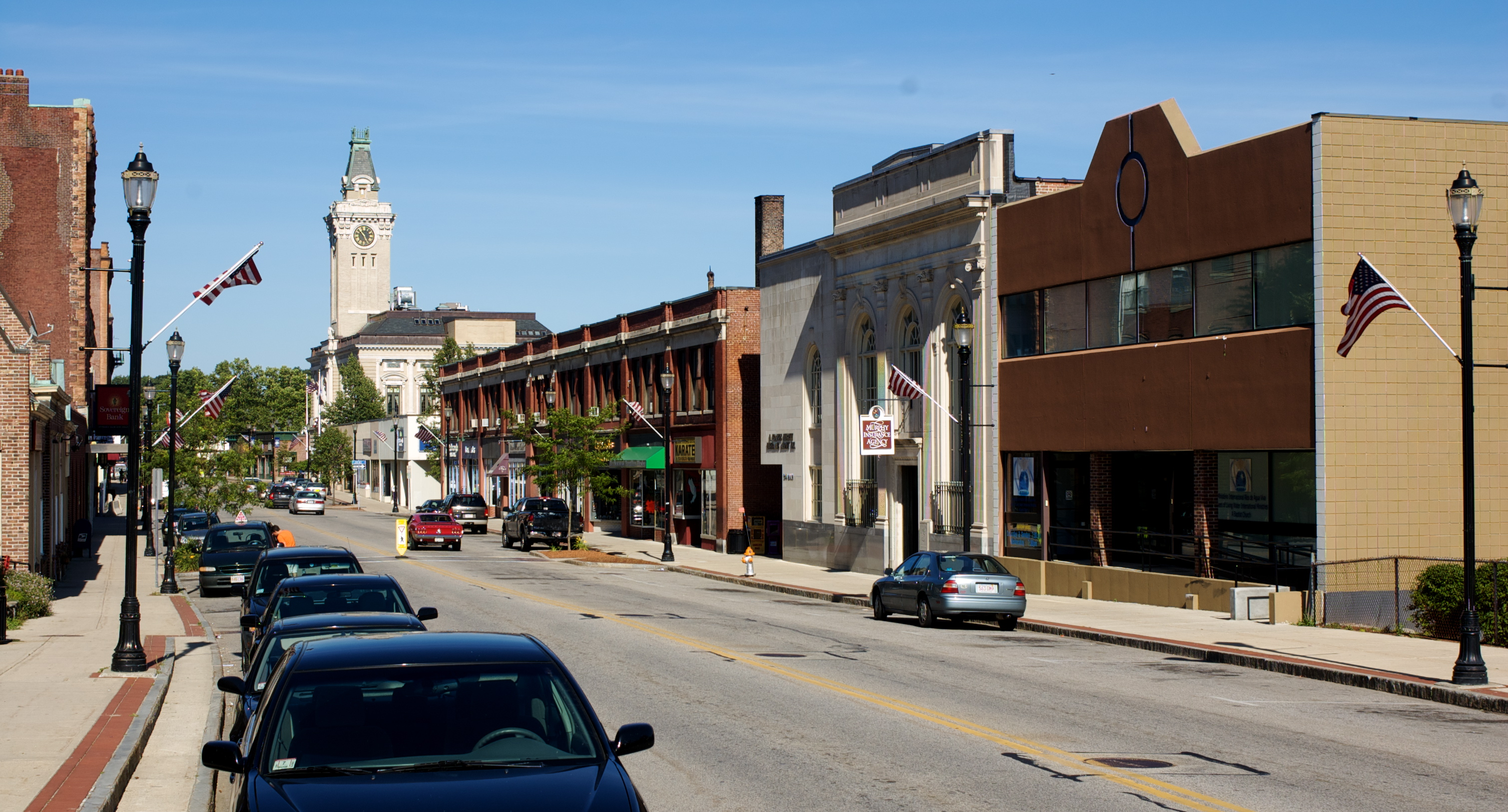

- Location within Massachusetts Location within the United States
- Location: Marlborough, Massachusetts
- Coordinates: 42°20′52″N 71°32′59″W
- Area: 23 acres (9.3 ha)
- Architect: Allen, Francis R.; et al.
- Architectural style: Mid 19th Century Revival, Late Victorian, Late 19th And 20th Century Revivals
- NRHP reference No.: 98000992
- Added to NRHP: August 19, 1998

The Marlborough Center Historic District is a historic district encompassing the civic and commercial heart of Marlborough, Massachusetts. It is centered on a stretch of Main Street between Mechanic Street to the west and Bolton Street (Massachusetts Route 85) to the east, and includes properties on adjacent streets. The center is reflective of the city's prosperity as an industrial center from the mid-19th century to the mid-20th century. The district was listed on the National Register of Historic Places in 1998.

== Description and history ==
The city of Marlborough is located in far western Middlesex County, Massachusetts, in the outer ring of Greater Boston fringed by Interstate 495. Its central business district is located along Main Street, roughly between Mechanic Street to the west and Bolton Street (Massachusetts State Route 85) to the east. This portion of Main Street was once designated as U.S. Highway Route 20, which now runs along a bypass just south of downtown. Marlborough was incorporated in 1660, and was a key stop on the main road between Boston and Springfield until the 20th century. Its original town center was north of Main Street between Prospect Street and Rawlins Avenue, where the district's oldest resources, the 1706 Old Common Cemetery, is located. The present business district arose in the 19th century with the advent of industrialization, growing along Main Street between that point and another small village at the junction with Bolton Street, a major north-south route in the area.

Most of the commercial buildings in the district are made of brick and stone, and were built in the late 19th or early 20th century. City Hall is a well-kept Beaux-Arts building designed by Allen, Collens & Berry, and built in 1905. Allen and Collens also designed the First National Bank building at 200 Main Street. There are four churches, and several stylish Queen Anne Victorian houses, notably that of Judge James MacDonald at 23 Prospect Street. It includes two previously-listed buildings: the Warren Block at 155 Main Street and the Temple Building at 149 Main.

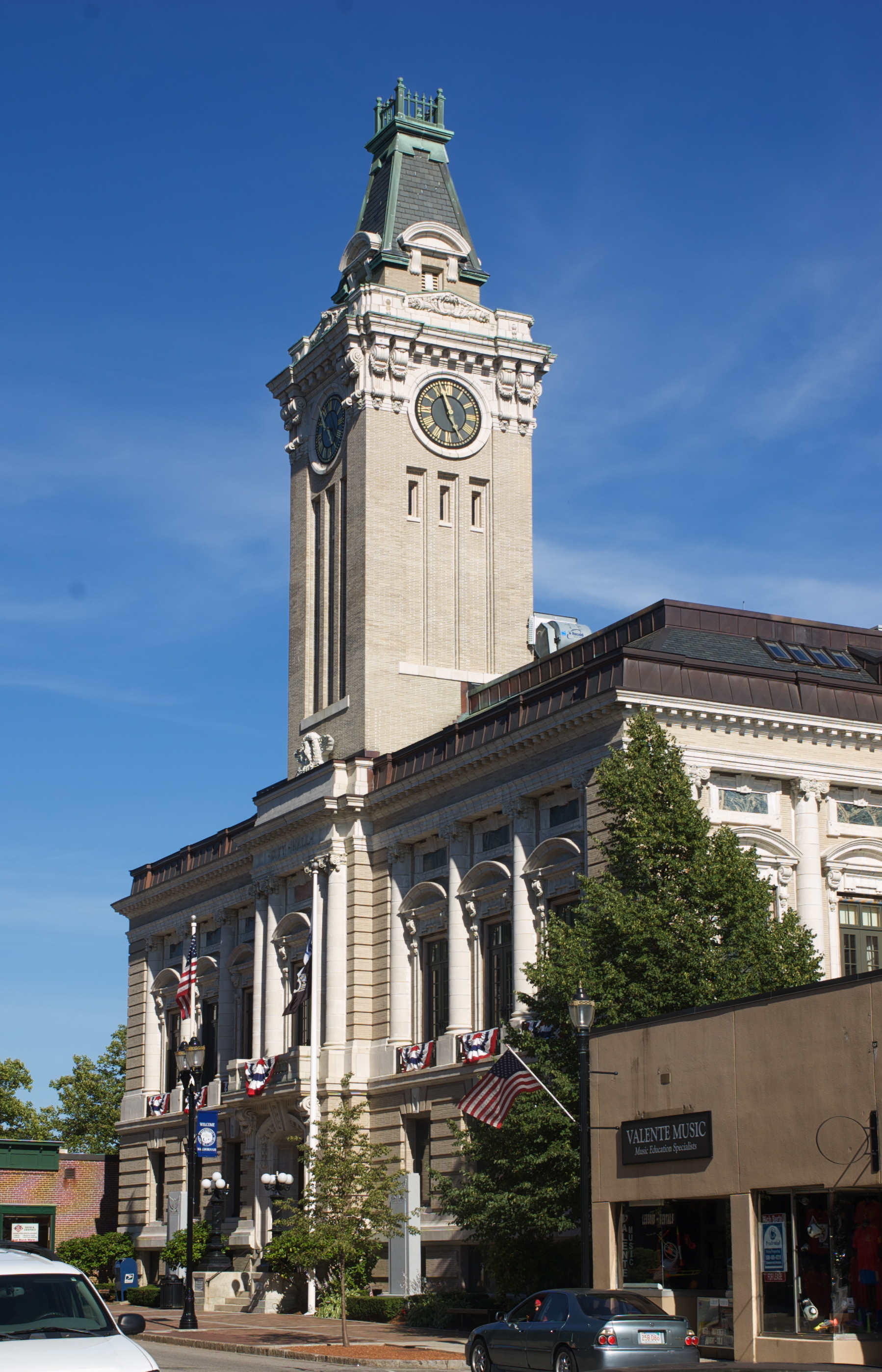
Marlborough City Hall on Main Street

== See also ==
- National Register of Historic Places listings in Marlborough, Massachusetts
