= Marlborough, Massachusetts =

- City
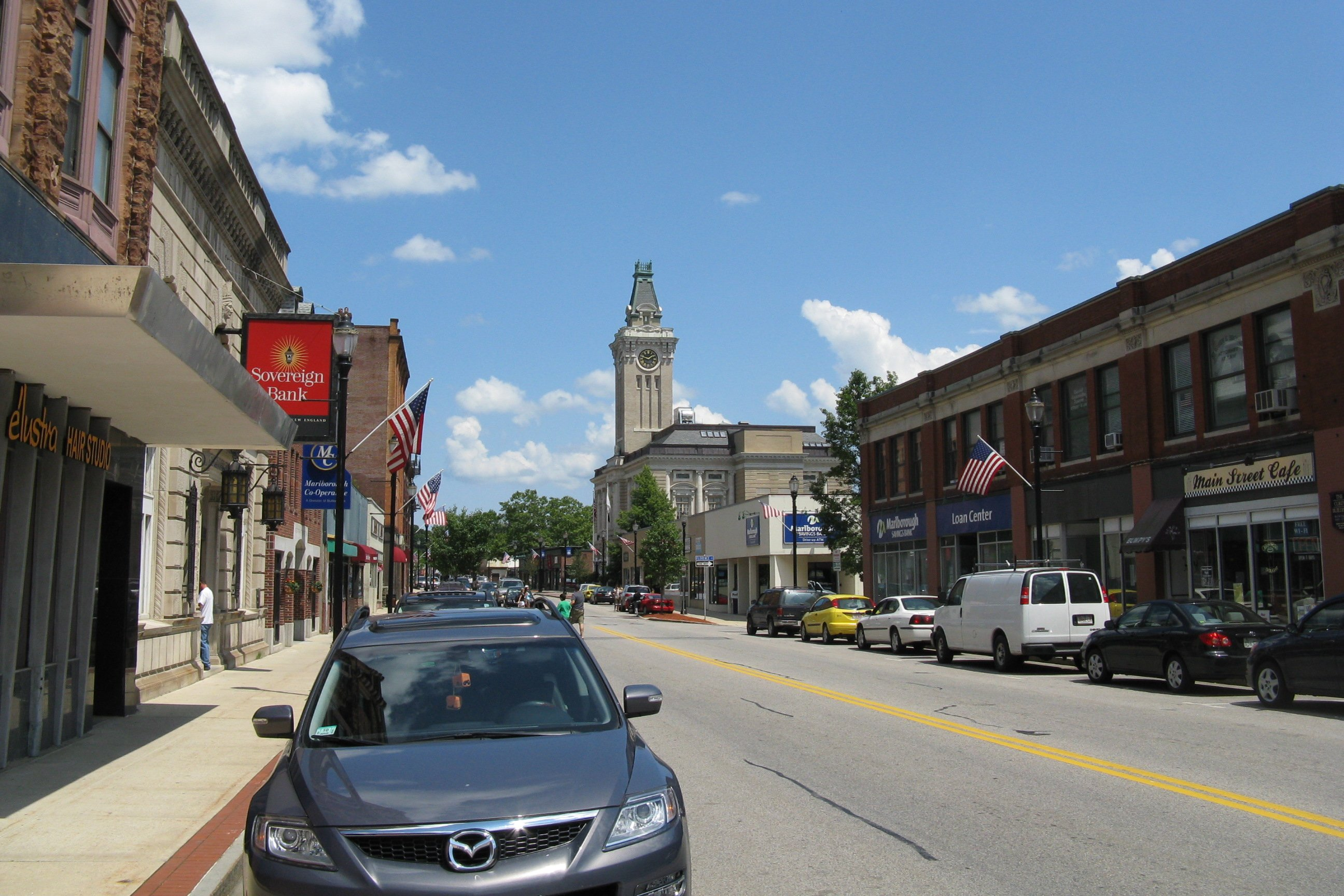
- Main Street

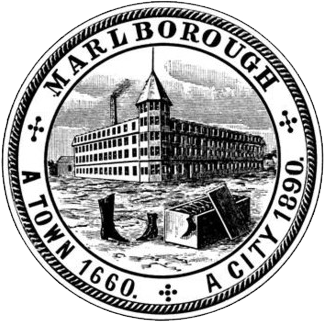
- Seal

- Location in Middlesex County in Massachusetts

- Location in the United States
- Coordinates: 42°20′45″N 71°33′10″W
- Country: United States
- State: Massachusetts
- County: Middlesex
- Settled: 1657
- Incorporated (town): September 20, 1660
- Incorporated (city): 1890

Government
  - Type: Mayor-council city
  - Mayor: Christian Dumais (U)

Area
  - Total: 22.10 sq mi (57.24 km^{2})
  - Land: 20.86 sq mi (54.04 km^{2})
  - Water: 1.24 sq mi (3.20 km^{2})
- Elevation: 449 ft (137 m)

Population (2020)
  - Total: 41,793
  - Density: 2,003.1/sq mi (773.41/km^{2})
- Demonym: Marlboronian
- Time zone: UTC−5 (Eastern)
  - Summer (DST): UTC−4 (Eastern)
- ZIP Code: 01752
- Area code: 508/774
- FIPS code: 25-38715
- GNIS feature ID: 0611360
- Website: www.marlborough-ma.gov

Marlborough is a city in Middlesex County, Massachusetts, United States. The population was 41,793 at the 2020 census. Marlborough became a prosperous industrial town in the 19th century and made the transition to high technology industry in the late 20th century after the construction of the Massachusetts Turnpike. It is part of the Worcester metropolitan area.

Marlborough was declared a town in 1660, and was incorporated as a city in 1890 when it changed its municipal charter from a New England town meeting system to a mayor–council government.

== History ==
In 1656, several families from Sudbury, Massachusetts, led by Edmund Rice, John Howe, John Ruddock, and John Bent, petitioned the Massachusetts General Court to create a new town. The proposed town would be located southwest of Sudbury at the intersection of two trails used by local Native American tribes, known as the Nashua Trail and Connecticut path. Its name would be Marlborough, after the market town in Wiltshire, England of the same name.

The land belonged to a tribe of Pennacook Native Americans whose population had been decimated by the introduction of European diseases a few decades prior. In 1656, only 50 or so Pennacooks remained in the area. The Pennacook people spoke an Algonquian language; this was among the reasons that Howe, a fur trader who spoke Algonquian, became the first settler to move to the area. The Pennacook, knowing their reduced numbers left them vulnerable to attacks from other Native groups, initially welcomed the settlers in exchange for their assistance protecting the tribe.

Marlborough was officially incorporated as a town in 1660. Rice, a former Puritan deacon, was elected a selectman in 1657. Sumner Chilton Powell wrote, in Puritan Village: The Formation of a New England Town, "Not only did Rice become the largest individual landholder in [the] Sudbury [area], but he represented his new town in the Massachusetts legislature for five years and devoted at least eleven of his last fifteen years to serving as selectman and judge of small causes."

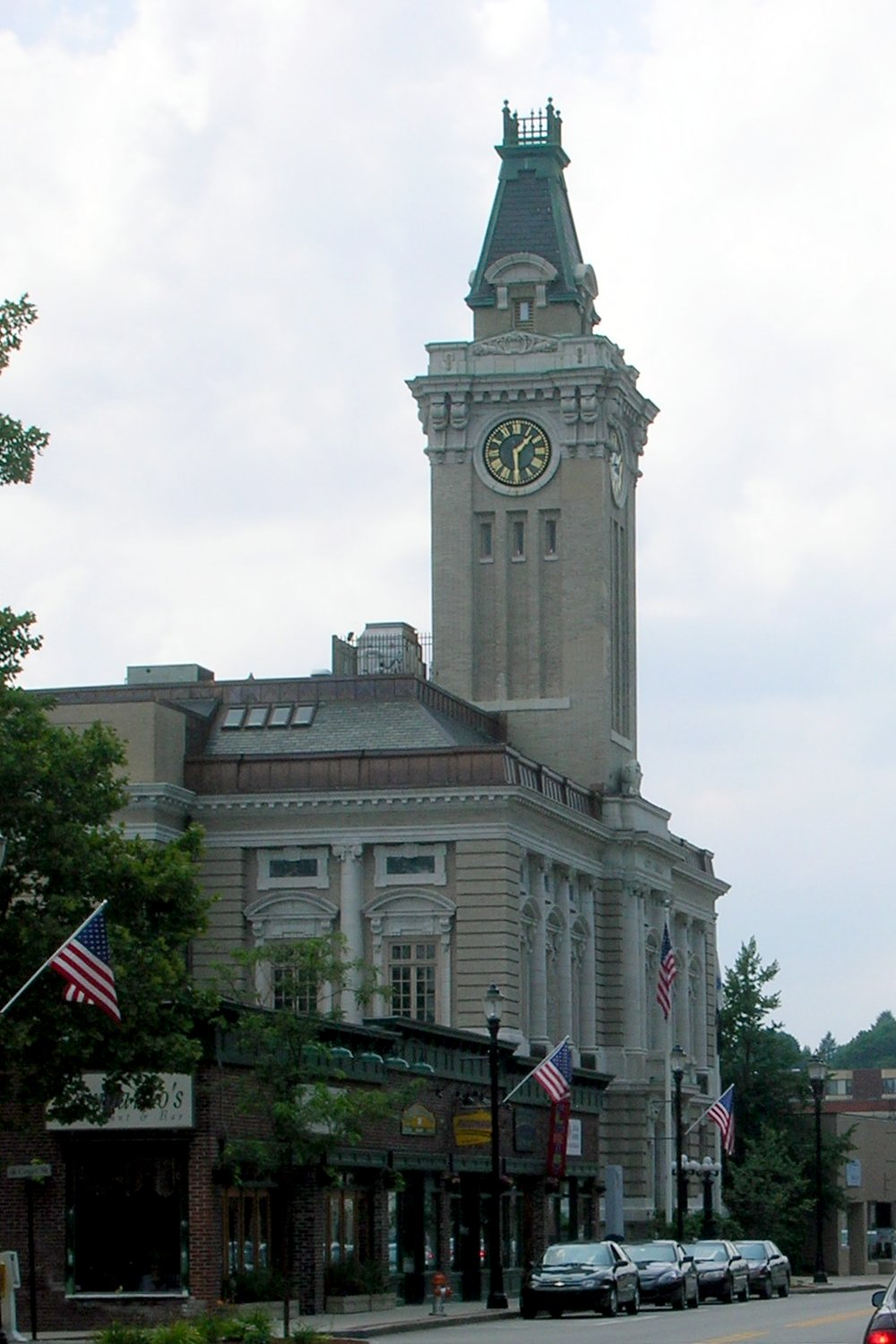
City Hall (1905) by Allen, Collins & Berry

The Puritan minister Reverend William Brimstead became the first minister of the First Church of Marlborough, and William Ward the first deacon. Johnathan Johnson was the first blacksmith.

Marlborough was one of the seven "Praying Indian Towns" because they were converted to Christianity by the Rev. John Eliot of Roxbury. In 1674, a deed was drawn up dividing the land between the settlers and the natives.

The outbreak of King Phillip's War in 1675 led to increased tension and distrust between the Native and European residents of Marlborough. Local officials, worried that even friendly tribes might feel betrayed and therefore be easily persuaded into joining Metacomet's forces, began rounding up Native Americans residing in the area. They were initially brought to Marlborough, where they were held in what historian John Buczek describes as "a sort of concentration camp." However, European settlers were concerned that there were insufficient guards to protect them if the prisoners were to rebel, so the Native Americans were displaced to Deer Island in Boston Harbor that winter. The forced removal of the Native Americans did not protect Marlborough as the settlement was almost destroyed by Metacomet's rebellion the following year.

In 1711, Marlborough's territory included land that today belongs to the towns of Northborough, Southborough, Westborough, and Hudson. As population, business, and travel grew in the colonies, Marlborough became a favored rest stop on the Boston Post Road. Many travelers stopped at its inns and taverns, including George Washington, who visited the Williams Tavern soon after his inauguration in 1789.

In 1836, Samuel Boyd, known as the "father of the city," and his brother, Joseph, opened the first shoe manufacturing business - an act that would change the community forever. By 1890, with a population of 14,000, Marlborough had become a major shoe manufacturing center, producing boots for Union soldiers as well as footwear for the civilian population. Marlborough became so well known for its shoes that when it was incorporated as a city in 1890, its official seal was decorated with a factory, a shoe box, and a pair of boots.

The Civil War resulted in the creation of one of the region's most unusual historical monuments. Legend has it that a company from Marlborough, assigned to Harpers Ferry, appropriated the bell from the firehouse where John Brown last battled for the emancipation of the slaves. The company left the bell in the hands of one Mrs. Elizabeth Snyder for 30 years, returning in 1892 to bring it back to Marlborough. The bell now hangs in a tower at the corner of Route 85 and Main Street.

Around that time, Marlborough is believed to have been the first community in the country to receive a charter for a streetcar system, edging out Baltimore by a few months. The system, designed primarily for passenger use, provided access to Milford to the south and Concord to the north. As a growing industrialized community, Marlborough began attracting skilled craftsmen from Quebec, Ireland, Italy, and Greece.

Shoe manufacturing continued in Marlborough long after the industry had fled many other New England communities. Rice & Hutchins, Inc. operated several factories in Marlborough from 1875 to 1929. Frye boots were manufactured in the city through the 1970s, and The Rockport Company, founded in Marlborough in 1971, maintained an outlet store in the city until 2017. In 1990, when Marlborough celebrated its centennial as a city, the festivities included the construction of a park in acknowledgment of the shoe industry, featuring statues by the sculptor David Kapenteopolous.

The construction of Interstates 495 and 290 and the Massachusetts Turnpike enabled the growth of the high technology and specialized electronics industries. With its easy access to major highways and the pro-business, pro-development policies of the city government, the population of Marlborough has increased to over 38,000 at the time of the 2010 census. In November 2016, the administration of Massachusetts Governor Charlie Baker announced a $3 million grant to the city to fund infrastructure improvements along U.S. Route 20 to aid commercial development.

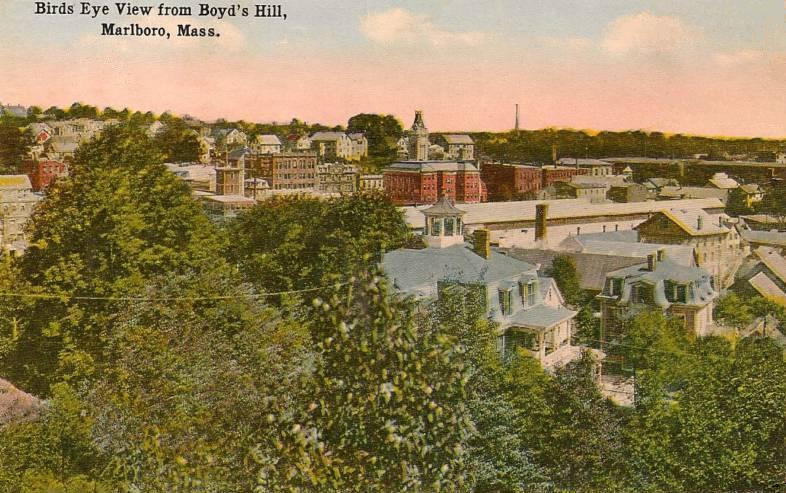
Bird's-eye view c. 1912

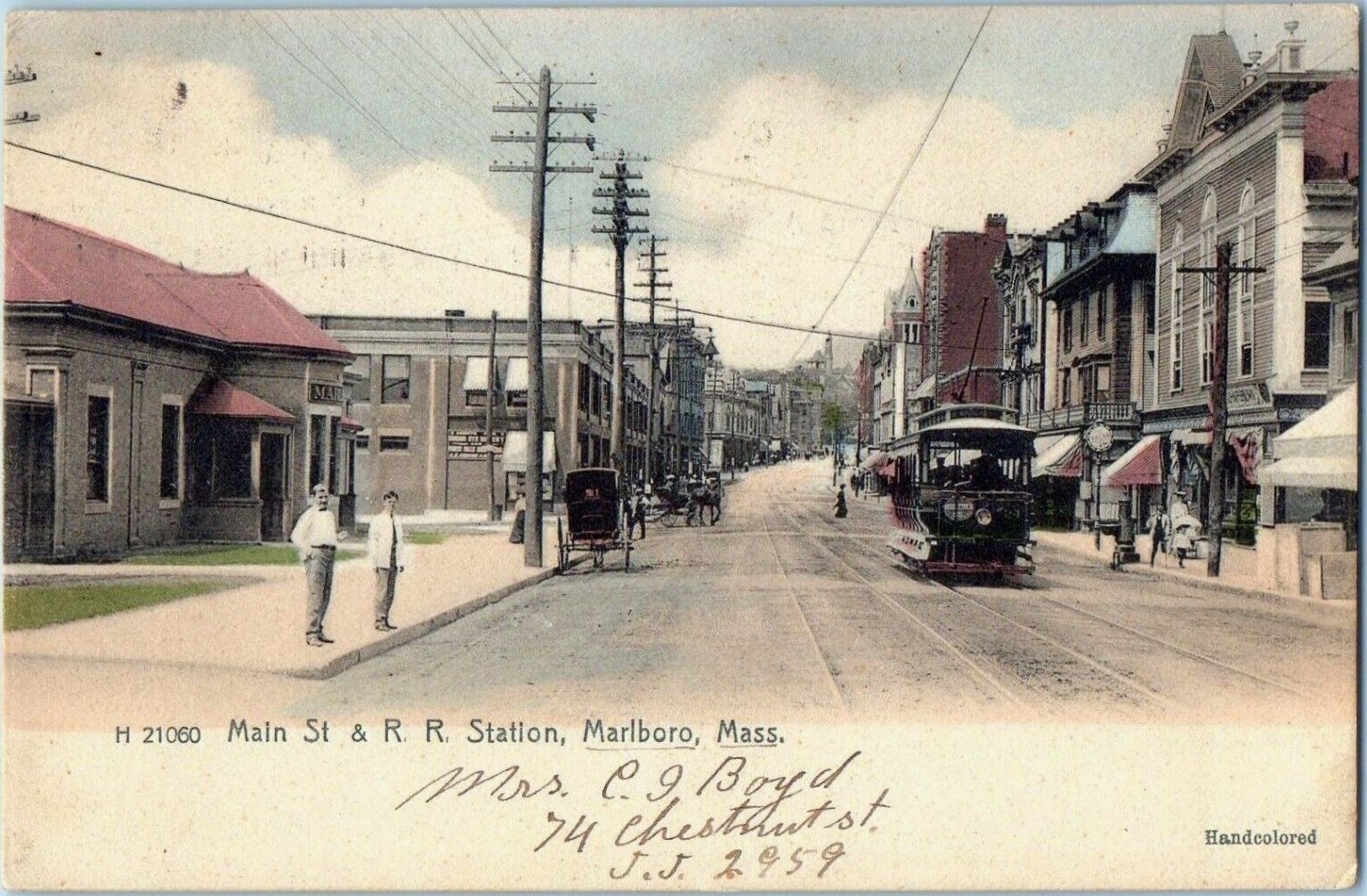
Main Street in 1906

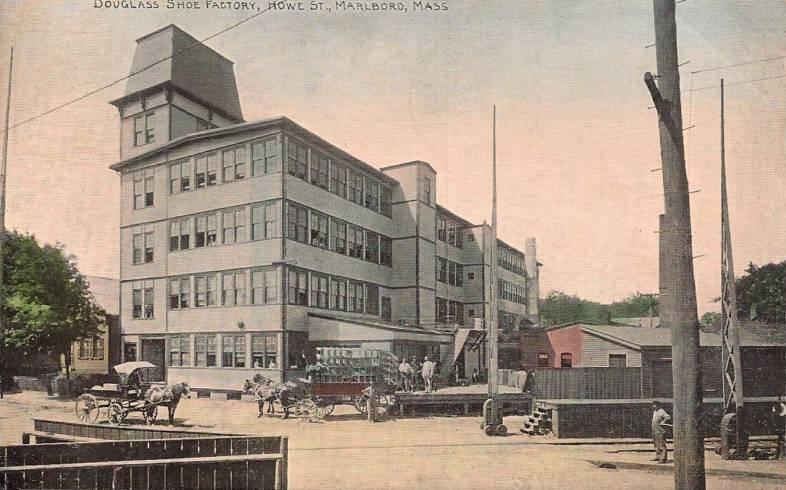
Shoe factory c. 1910

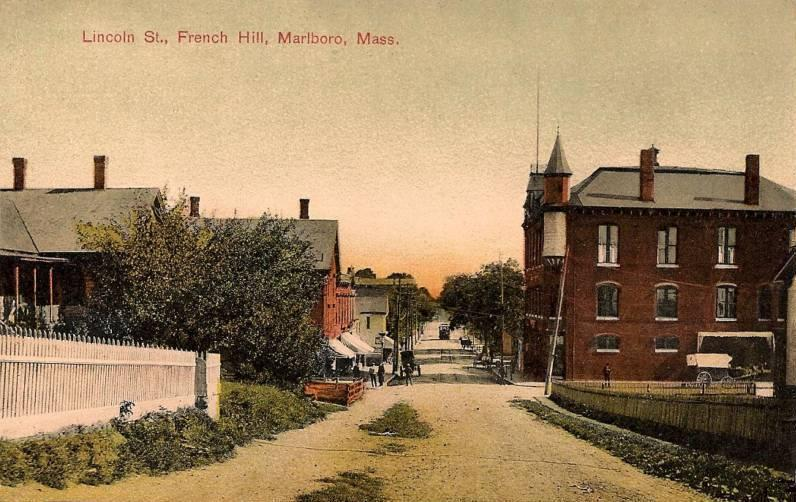
Lincoln Street c. 1908

== Geography ==
Marlborough is located at 42°21′3″N 71°32′51″W (42.350909, −71.547530). According to the United States Census Bureau, the city has a total area of 22.2 square miles (57 km^{2}), of which 21.1 square miles (55 km^{2}) is land and 1.1 square miles (2.8 km^{2}) (4.87%) is water. The Assabet River cuts across the northwest corner of the city. Within city limits are three large lakes, known as Lake Williams, Millham Reservoir and Fort Meadow Reservoir. (A portion of Fort Meadow Reservoir extends into nearby Hudson.)

Marlborough is crossed by Interstate 495, U.S. Route 20 and Massachusetts Route 85. The eastern terminus of Interstate 290 is also in Marlborough.

=== Adjacent towns ===
Marlborough is located in eastern Massachusetts, bordered by six municipalities: Berlin, Hudson, Sudbury, Framingham, Southborough, and Northborough.

== Demographics ==
Historical population
Year	Pop.	±%
1790	1,554	—
1800	1,735	+11.6%
1810	1,674	−3.5%
1820	1,952	+16.6%
1830	2,077	+6.4%
1840	2,101	+1.2%
1850	2,941	+40.0%
1860	5,911	+101.0%
1870	8,474	+43.4%
1880	10,127	+19.5%
1890	13,805	+36.3%
1900	13,609	−1.4%
1910	14,579	+7.1%
1920	15,028	+3.1%
1930	15,587	+3.7%
1940	15,154	−2.8%
1950	15,756	+4.0%
1960	18,819	+19.4%
1970	27,936	+48.4%
1980	30,617	+9.6%
1990	31,813	+3.9%
2000	36,255	+14.0%
2010	38,499	+6.2%
2020	41,793	+8.6%
2024*	42,169	+0.9%
* = population estimate. Source: United States census records and Population Estimates Program data. Source: U.S. Decennial Census

=== 2020 census ===
As of the 2020 census, Marlborough had a population of 41,793. The median age was 39.6 years. 19.8% of residents were under the age of 18 and 15.6% of residents were 65 years of age or older. For every 100 females there were 99.8 males, and for every 100 females age 18 and over there were 98.0 males age 18 and over.

98.8% of residents lived in urban areas, while 1.2% lived in rural areas.

There were 16,733 households in Marlborough, of which 28.3% had children under the age of 18 living in them. Of all households, 46.6% were married-couple households, 20.2% were households with a male householder and no spouse or partner present, and 26.2% were households with a female householder and no spouse or partner present. About 28.7% of all households were made up of individuals and 11.0% had someone living alone who was 65 years of age or older.

There were 17,547 housing units, of which 4.6% were vacant. The homeowner vacancy rate was 0.5% and the rental vacancy rate was 5.6%.

Racial composition as of the 2020 census
Race	Number	Percent
White	25,633	61.3%
Black or African American	1,420	3.4%
American Indian and Alaska Native	205	0.5%
Asian	2,463	5.9%
Native Hawaiian and Other Pacific Islander	8	0.0%
Some other race	6,019	14.4%
Two or more races	6,045	14.5%
Hispanic or Latino (of any race)	6,631	15.9%

=== 2000 census ===
As of the 2000 census, there were 36,255 people, 14,501 households, and 9,280 families residing in the city. The population density was 1,719.4 inhabitants per square mile (663.9/km^{2}). There were 14,903 housing units at an average density of 706.8 per square mile (272.9/km^{2}). The racial makeup of the city was 87.70% White, 2.17% African American, 0.20% Native American, 3.76% Asian, 0.04% Pacific Islander, 3.27% from other races, and 2.86% from two or more races. Hispanic or Latino of any race were 6.06% of the population.

There were 14,501 households, out of which 30.4% had children under the age of 18 living with them, 51.5% were married couples living together, 9.0% had a female householder with no husband present, and 36.0% were non-families. 28.4% of all households were made up of individuals, and 8.3% had someone living alone who was 65 years of age or older. The average household size was 2.47 and the average family size was 3.07.

In the city, the population was spread out, with 23.3% under the age of 18, 7.0% from 18 to 24, 36.7% from 25 to 44, 21.5% from 45 to 64, and 11.6% who were 65 years of age or older. The median age was 36 years. For every 100 females, there were 97.2 males. For every 100 females age 18 and over, there were 94.8 males.

The median income for a household in the city was $56,879, and the median income for a family was $70,385. Males had a median income of $49,133 versus $32,457 for females. The per capita income for the city was $28,723. About 4.7% of families and 6.8% of the population were below the poverty line, including 8.9% of those under age 18 and 10.3% of those age 65 or over.

== Economy ==
Marlborough is home to many businesses, stores and restaurants.

The revitalized southwestern corner of the city – locally known as the "Southwest Quadrant" – features numerous office parks and corporate buildings clustered together in a busy industrial core dotted along Forest Street, Cedar Hill Street, Simarano Drive, Ames Street, D’Angelo Drive and Campus Drive (serving The Campus at Marlborough property) with easy access to the Interstate 495 highway. The city's recent growth of suburban office park infrastructure adjacent to Interstate 495 – which is commonly known as Greater Boston's outer circumferential highway – is a strategic land usage format comparable to the city of Waltham, which itself has many office parks adjacent to the region's inner circumferential highway of Massachusetts State Route 128.

The Marlborough Center Historic District – focused primarily on Main Street in the heart of the city's downtown area – features restaurants, hair salons, barber shops, insurance agencies and many other businesses.

=== Marlborough Regional Chamber of Commerce ===
The Marlborough Regional Chamber of Commerce is the local chamber of commerce for Marlborough and five other surrounding towns in MetroWest Massachusetts. The chamber represents the business needs of over 650 businesses and thousands of employees in the area and is headquartered in the city.

The Chamber of Commerce's role has included working with the MetroWest Regional Transit Authority to improve transportation options and to obtain recognition for Marlborough's Downtown Village as a cultural district.

== Education ==
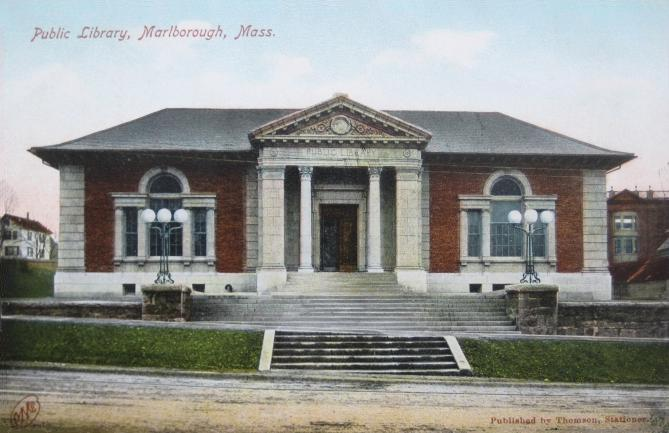
Public library (1903–1904), a Carnegie library designed by Peabody & Stearns

=== Public schools ===
- High schools (grades 9–12):
  - Marlborough High School
  - Assabet Valley Regional Technical High School
- Middle school (grades 6–8)
  - 1LT Charles W. Whitcomb School (formerly 4–7 School, Marlborough Middle School, and Marlborough Intermediate Elementary School)
- Elementary schools (grades K–5)
  - Raymond C. Richer Elementary School
  - Francis J. Kane Elementary School
  - Sgt. Charles J. Jaworek Elementary School
  - Goodnow Brothers Elementary School
- Preschool (up to Pre-K)
  - Early Childhood Center

=== Charter schools ===
- Advanced Math & Science Academy (grades 6–12)

=== Parochial schools ===
- Immaculate Conception School (Catholic, PS–8) (closed June 2020)

=== Private schools ===
- Hillside School (5–9)
- Wayside Academy (9–12)
- Massachusetts International Academy (closed June 2020)
- New England Innovation Academy (6–12)

=== After school programs ===
- Boys & Girls Clubs of Metrowest

== Transportation ==
Marlborough is located near the intersection of Routes 495, 290, 20 and the Massachusetts Turnpike. It is connected to neighboring towns and cities by the Metrowest Regional Transit Authority (MWRTA).

=== Major highways ===
Marlborough is served by two interstates, one U.S. highway and one state highway:

Major highways serving Marlborough
Route number	Type	Local name	Direction
Interstate 495	Interstate	Interstate 495 (Massachusetts)	north–south
Interstate 290	Interstate	Interstate 290 (Massachusetts)	east–west
U.S. Route 20	United States highway	Boston Post Rd., East/West Main St. Lakeside Ave and Granger Blvd.	east–west
Route 85	State route	Washington St., Bolton St. and Maple St.	north–south

=== Mass transit ===
Marlborough is served by several MetroWest Regional Transit Authority (MWRTA) bus routes, including connections to Southborough station and Framingham station on the Framingham/Worcester Line of the MBTA Commuter Rail system.

== Media ==
=== Newspapers ===
- Community Advocate, a weekly regional newspaper serving Marlborough and six surrounding communities.
- The MetroWest Daily News, a daily newspaper covering Marlborough and surrounding communities in the MetroWest region
- The Marlborough Enterprise, the city's weekly newspaper (defunct as of 2021)
- Marlborough Patch (online daily)
- The Main Street Journal, a weekly newspaper (defunct as of 2021)

=== Television ===
- Channel 8 (Comcast), Channel 34 (Verizon): WMCT-TV Your Community Station (Marlborough Cable Trust).
- Channel 96 (Comcast), Channel 33 (Verizon): Marlborough Access, Public Access Television (Marlborough Cable Trust).
- Channel 98: Marlborough Public Schools' student run station

== Arts ==
=== Ghost Light Players of MetroWest ===
Ghost Light Players is a 501(c)(3) charitable organization based in Marlborough. The group has been performing in and around the Marlborough area since 2012, with productions including Hamlet, Dog Sees God, Romeo and Juliet, Macbeth, Godspell, and Love Comics.

== Sports ==
=== Marlborough Country Club ===
The Marlborough Country Club was host of Senior PGA Tour Event The Marlborough Classic from 1981 to 1983. Bob Goalby won the event in 1981, with Arnold Palmer winning in 1982 and Don January winning in 1983. The event has since changed locations to the Nashawtuc Country Club in Concord, Massachusetts and is now called Bank of America Championship.

=== Teams ===
- Providence Bruins – AHL affiliate of the Boston Bruins (temporarily relocated to Marlborough during the 2020–21 season)
- Boston Junior Bruins – youth ice hockey team in the United States Premier Hockey League (USPHL)
- Marlboro Shamrocks – Semi-Professional football team (New England Football League)
- Boston Rockhoppers – former professional indoor lacrosse team in the North American Lacrosse League

== Points of interest ==
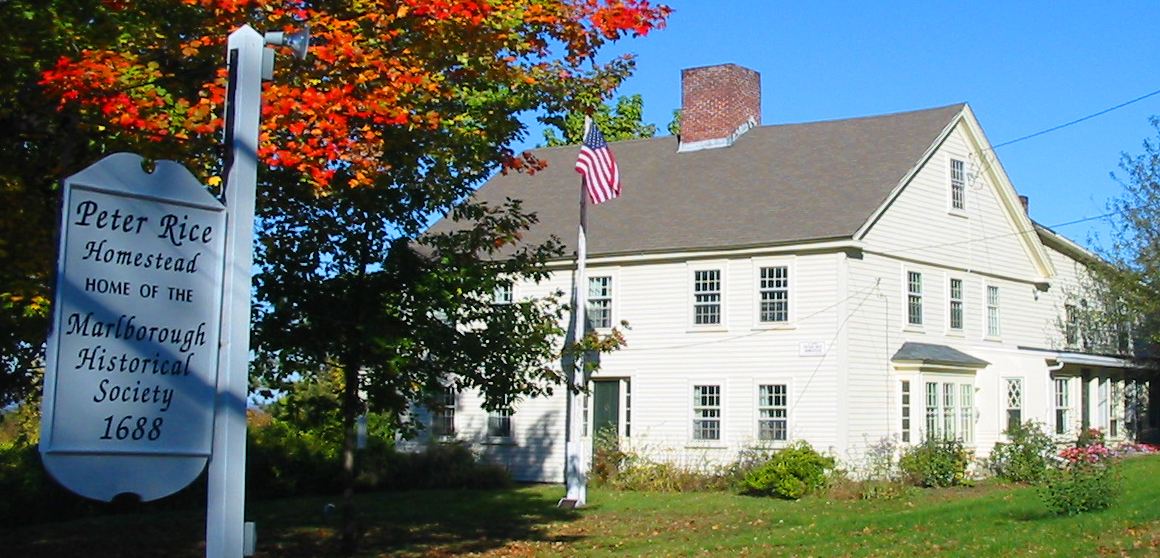
The Peter Rice Homestead (c. 1688), home of the Marlborough Historical Society

- Assabet River Rail Trail
- Brigham Cemetery
- Callahan State Park
- Capt. Peter Rice House
- John Brown Bell
- John J. Carroll Water Treatment Plant
- Maplewood Cemetery
- Mass Central Rail Trail—Wayside
- Marlboro Airport (closed)
- Marlborough Country Club
- Marlborough Memorial Beach
- Marlborough Center Historic District
- New England Sports Center
- Robin Hill Cemetery
- Rocklawn Cemetery
- Solomon Pond Mall
- Weeks Cemetery
- Wilson Cemetery

== Notable people ==
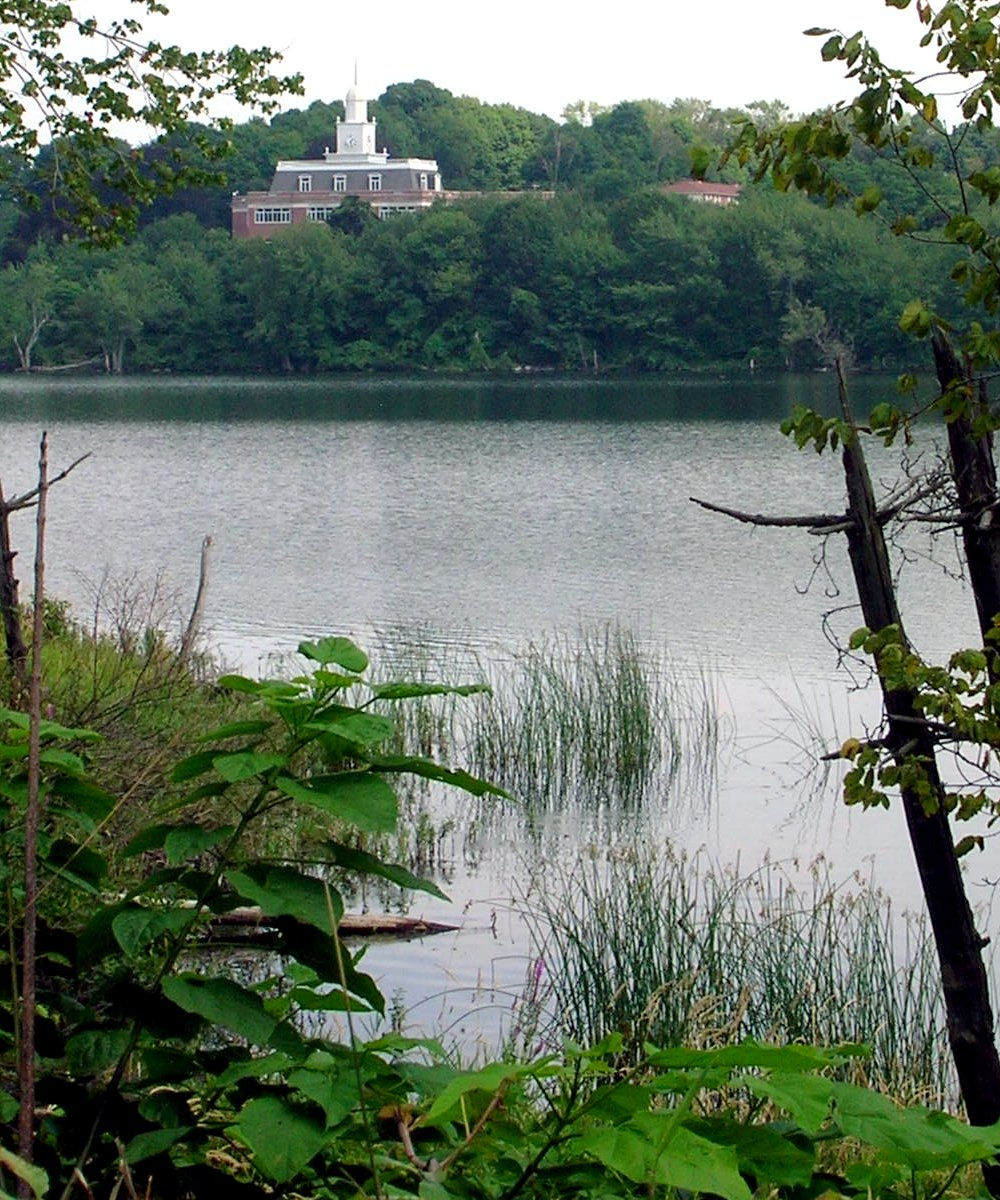
Marlborough District Courthouse, seen from across Lake Williams

- Horatio Alger, Jr., author, graduated from high school in Marlborough in 1847 (The city's annual Horatio Alger Street Fair was renamed the Harvest Fair in 2007)
- Zach Auguste National Basketball Association player
- Ella A. Bigelow (1849–1917), author and clubwoman
- Walter Brennan, American actor and singer, attended Marlborough High School
- Asa Brigham, politician and businessman
- Carl C. Brigham, psychologist and creator of the SAT Test
- Caroline Brown Buell (1843–1927), activist
- John Buckley, baseball pitcher
- Mike Burns, soccer player, 1992 Olympian, and 1998 FIFA World Cup player
- Rich Busa, marathon runner
- Bobby Butler, NHL hockey player
- George T. Conway III, lawyer, political commentator; graduated from Marlborough High School in 1980
- Marcia Cross, actress best known for her role in Desperate Housewives; graduated from Marlborough High School in 1980
- Aaron Dalbec, guitarist in bands including Converge, Bane, Be Well and Only Crime
- Crystal Eastman, lawyer, journalist and activist
- Charles "Duke" Farrell, catcher of the World Series–winning Boston Americans team of 1903
- Heather Fogarty, musician and actress
- Philo C. Fuller, former US Congressman
- Joey Graceffa, actor, author, singer, and YouTube personality
- Gilman Bigelow Howe, genealogist and author
- James Simon Kunen, author of The Strawberry Statement: Notes of a College Revolutionary
- Amory Maynard, industrialist, founder and namesake of Maynard, Massachusetts
- John J. Mitchell, former U.S. Congressman
- Robert J. Murray, Under Secretary of the Navy
- Roy Nutt, businessman and computer pioneer
- George Pyne II, American football player
- Ken Reynolds, Major League Baseball player
- Jim Reynolds, Major League Baseball umpire
- Edmund Rice, co-founder and early resident
- Franklin Pierce Rice, printer, publisher and antiquarian
- Henry Rice, Massachusetts state legislator and subject of Gilbert Stuart portrait
- John Rock, gynecologist and obstetrician, co-credited with developing the first effective oral contraceptive
- Canaan Severin, American football wide receiver
- Sidney Sherman, Military leader, Texas Revolution
- Bill Simmons, sports personality
- Lucy Goodale Thurston, missionary
- John Patrick Treacy, Roman Catholic Bishop of the Diocese of La Crosse
- Bobb Trimble, musician
- Paul Warnke, diplomat
- Katya Zamolodchikova, drag queen

== Sister cities and towns ==
Cities

- – Akiruno, Tokyo, Japan from November 3, 1998
- – Ipatinga, Minas Gerais, Brazil from June, 2009

Towns

- – Marlborough, Wiltshire, England, United Kingdom from 1657

== See also ==
- Marlborough Country Club
- National Register of Historic Places listings in Marlborough, Massachusetts
