= Slavery in Sudan =

Slavery in Sudan began in ancient times, and had a resurgence during the Second Sudanese Civil War (1983–2005). During the Trans-Saharan slave trade, many Nilotic peoples from the lower Nile Valley were purchased as slaves and brought to work elsewhere in North Africa and the Orient by Nubians, Egyptians, Berbers and Arabs.

Starting in 1995, many human rights organizations have reported on contemporary practice, especially in the context of the Second Sudanese civil war. According to reports of Human Rights Watch and others, during the war the government of Sudan was involved in backing and arming numerous slave-taking militias in the country as part of its war against the Sudan People's Liberation Army (SPLA). It also found the government failed to enforce Sudanese laws against kidnapping, assault and forced labor, or to help victims' families locate their children.

Another report (by the International Eminent Persons Group) found both the government-backed militias and the rebels (led by the SPLA) guilty of abducting civilians, though the abducting civilians by pro-government militias was "of particular concern" and "in a significant number of cases", led to slavery "under the definition of slavery in the International Slavery Convention of 1926". The Sudanese government maintained that the slavery is the product of inter-tribal warfare, over which it had no control.

According to the Rift Valley Institute, slave raiding and abduction "effectively ceased" in 2002, although an "unknown number" of slaves remained in captivity. "Slave" (or Abeed) is a racial epithet directed towards darker-skinned Sudanese.

== History of slavery in Sudan ==
=== Antiquity ===
Slavery in the region of the Sudan has a long history. The earliest recorded evidence dates to the reign of the First Dynasty pharaoh Djer, around 2900 BCE, when the acquisition of Nubian slaves from Sudan was recorded near the Second Cataract of the Nile.

Prisoners of war were a regular occurrence in the ancient Nile Valley and other parts of Africa. During times of conquest and after winning battles, Egyptians were taken as slaves by the ancient Nubians. In turn, The ancient Nubians took slaves after winning battles with the Libyans, Canaanites, and Egyptians.

=== Middle ages ===
Soon after the Arab conquest of Egypt, the Arabs attempted to conquer the kingdoms of Christian Nubia on multiple occasions, but utilizing strategic warfare, the significantly smaller Christian Nubia defeated the larger Arab forces. Eventually, given their unsuccessful efforts, the Arabs signed the 600-year Baqt treaty with the Christian Nubian kingdom of Makuria. As a part of the treaty, the Nubians, already involved in the burgeoning East African slave trade, agreed to trade 360 slaves annually to their northern neighbors in exchange for spices and grains.

=== 16th- to 19th-centuries ===
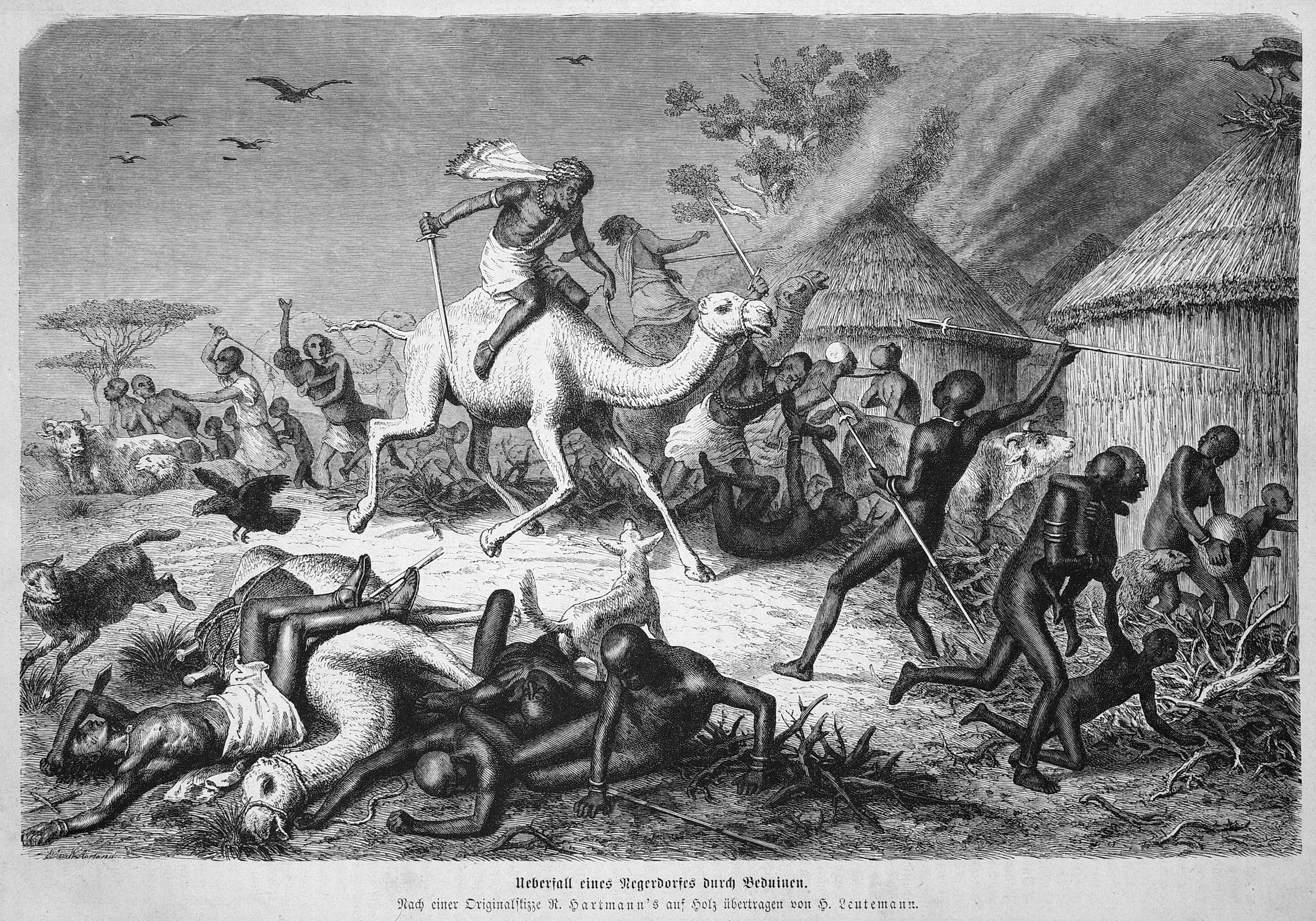
Sudanese tribesmen raid a Dinka village in around 1870

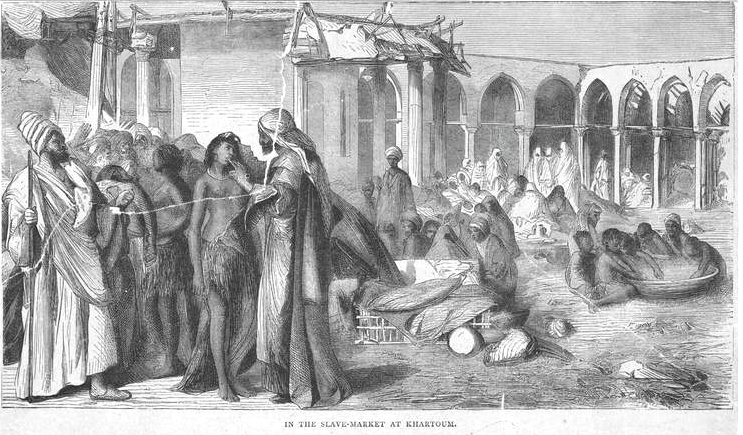
A slave market in Khartoum, Sudan, c. 1876

After the Nubian kingdoms' fall in 1504, the Muslims conquered most of Nubia, while the Funj conquered much of modern-day Sudan from Darfur to Khartoum; the Funj began to use slaves in the army in the reign of Badi III (r. 1692–1711). Later, Egyptian slavers began raiding the area of southern Sudan. In particular, the ruler Muhammad Ali of Egypt attempted to build up an army of southern Sudanese slaves with the aid of the Nubian slave traders. Attempts to ban slavery were later attempted by British colonial authorities in 1899, after their victory in the Mahdi War.

According to British explorer and abolitionist Samuel Baker, who visited Khartoum in 1862, six decades after the British authorities had declared the slave trade illegal, slavery was the industry "that kept Khartoum going as a bustling town". Baker described the practice of slave raiding of villages to the south by Sudanese slavers from Khartoum: An armed group would sail up the Nile, find a convenient African village, surround it during night and attack just before dawn, burning huts and shooting. Women and young adults would be captured and bound with "forked poles on their shoulders", hand tied to the pole in front, children bound to their mothers. To render "the village so poor that surviving inhabitants would be forced to collaborate with slavers on their next excursion against neighboring villages," the village would be looted of cattle, grain, ivory, with everything else destroyed.

John Lewis Burckhardt wittnessed the slave trade in Nubia and observed in 1819:

"I may venture to state (whatever may be the opinion at Cairo), that very few female slaves who have passed their tenth year, reach Egypt or Arabia in a state of virginity. The grandees, and rich people of those countries, take care never to buy grown up females from the traders, except for servants; but they often purchase very young girls."

The controversial practice of concubinage among Europeans in 19th century Sudan was widespread. Many European missionaries purchased young female slaves and lived with them outside formal marriage. Legal marriages among Europeans in Khartoum were reportedly uncommon, of the 42 European residents in Khartoum in the 1870s, only three or four were legally married. This situation resulted in a large number of children born outside marriage, many of whom were later christened, while some concubines were canonically married. Marie Peney, an Oromo woman from western Abyssinia, was taken as a concubine in 1850 by Alfred Peney, Sudan’s chief medical officer, and was married to him in 1855, she was married to two other Europeans before her death in 1891. Another example was the Belgian traveler Eugene de Pruyssenaere, who had married an Oromo slave-girl given to him by an Arab shaikh while in Sudan, after his death she married Martin Ludwig Hansal, the Austrian vice-consul. Fearing the social stigma at home, many Europeans left their African wives and children behind in Khartoum before returning to Europe alone.

Licurgo Santoni wrote:

"At this moment there are Abyssinian women with children begotten by their dead European masters and who live in the greatest poverty. Some become the mistresses of newly arrived Europeans and the children of former unions are cast out into the streets and merge with the native population. Some Europeans have deserted their own wives and children in their own lands and have formed new and illegitimate families here."

Reports from 1888 noted that the slave market of Khartoum was supplied by "Galla" slaves. In 1877, the Anti-Slavery reporter published a description of a Gallabat slave market:

"We rode into a large field outside the town, where were a number of long low booths, made very roughly of branches. Each of these booths was divided into several little compartments, the interior of which was hidden from view by curtains of native cloth hung in front of them. The slave merchants sat smoking beside their booths with Arab gravity. We visited them one after the other, and they led us into the different compartments, expatiating on the beauty and merits of their slaves, very much as a dealer shows off his horses. Galla and Abyssinian girls were numerous, and averaged from thirty to seventy dollars. Over the head of each was thrown a piece of cotton cloth, which concealed her features till her turn came to be inspected, when the dealer removed it, like an upholsterer uncovering a chair. They had scarcely any clothing, and sat crowded together in their little cells, with the African sun burning down on the flat roof close above their heads, in an atmos phere which was perfectly stifling."

MacMillan's Magazine in July 1874 had also reported on slave dealings in Gallabat:

"The Abyssinian girls are remarkably pretty, with large eyes and delicately shaped features. These girls are brought down from the Galla country by the slave-dealers from Abyssinia. A great market is at Gallabat, the frontier town of Abyssinia. There I have seen them crowded together in mat tents, waiting for purchasers from those commissioned to procure slaves by the wealthy Arabs and Turkish officials. At Gallabat a handsome young girl of sixteen is worth about 15£, but the same girl at Cairo would fetch 40 or 50£. Although they are generally termed Abyssinians (Habbesheea), I have never met with a true high-caste Abyssinian girl these would be Christians; whereas all I have seen have been Gallas, a Mohammedan race. Many of these poor girls die from fatigue on the desert. In the Soudan I have met several charming Abyssinian ladies married to European residents."

=== 20th-century ===
Before the slavery investigation of the League of Nations in 1923, the Anglo-Egyptian Sudan (1899–1956) had disbanded the Slavery Repression Department with the claim that slavery had become a marginal phenomenon. The report on Sudan to the Temporary Slavery Commission (1923–1925) described the enslavement of Nilotic Non-Muslims of the South West by the Muslim Arabs in the North, where most agriculture was still managed by slave labor in 1923.

The British colonial authorities actively fought the slave trade in Sudan but avoided addressing slavery itself for fear of causing unrest. The British allowed all slavery issued to be handled by the sharia courts which were controlled by the slave owning elite, which used Islamic law to control women, children and slaves. Slave raids were conducted from Ethiopia and Equatorial Africa and kidnapped people were exported to slavery in Arabia.

In the 1920s, the British agricultural officer P. W. Diggle conducted a personal campaign freeing slaves in Sudan. He was outraged in seeing slaves beaten, children taken from their parents and slave girls used for prostitution. Diggle was an important informer to the Temporary Slavery Commission or TSC about slavery in Sudan, which put pressure on the British in relation to the TSC.

The British stated to Frederick Lugard, 1st Baron Lugard of the TSC, that it was not possible to abolish slavery in Sudan because of the massive risk for unrest in "so lightly held and explosive a country as the Sudan" where slavery was allowed per Islamic law. The British also presented a circular issued 6 May 1925 stating that all slaves born after 1898 were free by law and that slaves had the right to leave their owners and would not be returned if they did so, which gave the TSC the impression that action was taken by the British against slavery in Sudan.

It was soon found that the 6 May 1925 circular was in fact issued only to British officials and unknown to the Sudanese. When this fact was raised in the House of Lords, however, the colonial administration was ordered to publish and enforce the provisions against slavery in Sudan. Furthermore, action was taken against the Red Sea slave trade via Sudan by taking better control of the Hajj pilgrimage and establishing a clearinghouse in Port Sudan for slaves repatriated by the British from slavery in the Kingdom of Hejaz, resulting in over 800 slaves resettled between 1925 and 1935.

During the Temporary Slavery Commission (TSC), a flourishing slave trade was discovered between Sudan and Ethiopia: slave raids were conducted from Ethiopia to the Funj and White Nile provinces in South Sudan, capturing Berta, Gumuz and Burun non-Muslims, who were bought from Ethiopian slave traders by Arab Sudanese Muslims in Sudan or across the border in the independent Empire of Ethiopia.

The most prominent slave trader was Khojali al-Hassan, "Watawit" shaykh of Bela Shangul in Wallagi, and his principal wife Sitt Amna, who had been acknowledged by the British as the head of an administrative unit in Sudan in 1905. Khojali al-Hassan collected slaves – normally adolescent girls and boys or children – by kidnapping, debt servitude or as tribute from his feudal subjects, and would send them across the border to his wife, who sold them to buyers in Sudan.

British Consul Hodson in Ethiopia reported that the 1925 edict had no practical effect on slavery and slave trade conducted across the Sudanese-Ethiopian border to Tishana: the Ethiopians demanded taxes and took children of people who could not pay and enslaved them; slave raids were still conducted against villages at nighttime by bandits burning huts, killing old and enslaving young. On one occasion in March 1925, when bandits were arrested, the government soldiers confiscated the 300 captured slaves and instead divided them as slaves to their soldiers; women and children were sold for a price of $15MT in Ethiopia, and the formal anti-slavery edict of 1925 was a mere formality. In 1927, the slave trader Khojali al-Hassan, "Watawit" shaykh of Bela Shangul in Wallagi, was reported to have trafficked 13,000 slaves from Ethiopia to the Sudan via his wife Sitt Amna.

In 1929, the slave raids conducted by Ethiopia into British Kenya as well as the ongoing slave trade in Sudan contributed to British support for the foundation of the Committee of Experts on Slavery of the League of Nations.

== Modern-day slavery ==
In the 1980s, during the Second Sudanese Civil War, there was a resurgence of the Sudanese slave trade under the National Islamic Front and groups such as the Baggara and Rizeigat. It involved large numbers of Sudanese people from the southern and central regions, "primarily the Dinka, Nuer and Nuba of central Sudan," being captured and sold "(or exploited in other ways)" by Northern Sudanese who consider themselves as Arabs. The problem of slavery reportedly became worse after the National Islamic Front-backed military government took power in 1989, the Khartoum government declared jihad against non-Muslim opposition in the south. The Baggara were also given freedom "to kill these groups, loot their wealth, capture slaves, expel the rest from the territories, and forcefully settle their lands."

The Sudan Criminal Code of 1991 did not list slavery as a crime, but the Republic of Sudan has ratified the Slavery Convention, the Supplementary Convention on the Abolition of Slavery, the Slave Trade, and Institutions and Practices Similar to Slavery, and is a party to the International Covenant on Civil and Political Rights (ICCPR). Nonetheless, according to the imam of the Ansar movement and former prime minister, Sadiq al-Mahdi, jihad

requires initiating hostilities for religious purposes. [...] It is true that the [NIF] regime has not enacted a law to realize slavery in Sudan. But the traditional concept of jihad does allow slavery as a by-product [of jihad].

Human Rights Watch and Amnesty International first reported on slavery in Sudan in 1995 in the context of the Second Sudanese Civil War. In 1996, two more reports emerged, one by a United Nations representative and another by reporters from the Baltimore Sun, just one of many "extensive accounts of slave raiding" in Sudan provided by Western media outlets since 1995. (Note: According to researcher Jok Madut Jok, extensive accounts of slave raiding since 1995 can be found in US magazines and newspapers: The New Yorker, The Washington Post, The Washington Times, The New York Times, The Los Angeles Times, The Boston Globe, as well as The South African Mail and Guardian, and a number of European and Canadian magazines and newspapers. "Many of them have also tried to expose the role of the government in slave taking." In Sudan itself "systematic and instrumental journalistic writing" on slavery has come from Bona Malwal (a Sudanese journalist and former government minister), who pioneered the campaign to expose the practice in the 1980s as editor of the Sudan Times,)

Human Rights Watch and others have described the contemporary form of slavery in Sudan as mainly the work of the armed, government-backed militia of the Baggara tribes who raid civilians—primarily of the Dinka ethnic group from the southern region of Bahr El Ghazal. The Baggara captured children and women who were taken to western Sudan and elsewhere. They were "forced to work for free in homes and in fields, punished when they refuse, and abused physically and sometimes sexually". The government of Sudan "arm[ed] and sanction[ed] the practice of slavery by this tribal militia", known as muraheleen, as a low cost way of weakening its enemy in the Second Sudanese Civil War, the rebel Sudan People's Liberation Movement/Army (SPLM/A), which was thought to have a base of support among the Dinka tribe of southern Sudan.

According to a 2002 report issued by the International Eminent Persons Group, (acting with the encouragement of the US State Department) both the government-backed militias and the rebels (led by the SPLA) have been found guilty of abducting civilians, but "of particular concern" were incidents that occurred "in conjunction with attacks by pro-government militias known as murahaleen on villages in SPLA-controlled areas near the boundary between northern and southern Sudan." The Group concluded that "in a significant number of cases", abduction is the first stage in "a pattern of abuse that falls under the definition of slavery in the International Slavery Convention of 1926 and the Supplementary Convention of 1956."

Estimates of abductions during the war range from 14,000 to 200,000. Abduction of Dinka women and children was common. One estimate by social historian Jok Madut Jok is of 10–15,000 slaves in Sudan "at any one time", the number remaining roughly constant as individual slaves come and go—as captives escape, have their freedom bought or are released as unfit for labor, more are captured. Until 1999, the number of slaves kept by slave taker retains after the distribution of the human war booty was usually "three to six and rarely exceeded ten per slave raider". Although modern slave trading never approached the scale of nineteenth-century Nilotic slavery, some Baggara "operated as brokers to convert the war captives into slaves", selling slaves "at scattered points throughout Western Sudan", and "as far north as Kharoum". Illegal and highly unpopular internationally, the trade is done "discreetly", and kept to a "minimal level" so that "evidence for it is very difficult to obtain." "Slave owners simply deny that Southern children working for them are slaves."

According to a January 25, 1999, report in CBS news, slaves have been sold for $50 each.

In September, 2000, the U.S. State Department alleged that "the Sudanese government's support of slavery and its continued military action which has resulted in numerous deaths are due in part to the victims' religious beliefs." Jok Madut Jok, professor of History at Loyola Marymount University, states that the abduction of women and children of the south by the north is slavery by any definition. The government of Sudan insists that the whole matter is no more than the traditional tribal feuding over resources.

Writing for The Wall Street Journal on December 12, 2001, Michael Rubin said:

What's Sudanese slavery like? One 11-year-old Christian boy told me about his first days in captivity: "I was told to be a Muslim several times, and I refused, which is why they cut off my finger." Twelve-year-old Alokor Ngor Deng was taken as a slave in 1993. She has not seen her mother since the slave raiders sold the two to different masters. Thirteen-year-old Akon was seized by Sudanese military while in her village five years ago. She was gang-raped by six government soldiers, and witnessed seven executions before being sold to a Sudanese Arab.

Many freed slaves bore signs of beatings, burnings and other tortures. More than three-quarters of formerly enslaved women and girls reported rapes.

While nongovernmental organizations argue over how to end slavery, few deny the existence of the practice. ...[E]stimates of the number of blacks now enslaved in Sudan vary from tens of thousands to hundreds of thousands (not counting those sold as forced labour in Libya)...

The Sudanese government has never admitted to the existence of "slavery" within their borders, but in 1999, under international pressure, it established the committee to Eradicate the Abduction of Women and Children (CEAWC). 4,000 "abducted" southerners were returned to South Sudan through this program before it was shut down in 2010.

=== End of trade ===
According to the Rift Valley Institute, slave-raiding, "abduction … effectively ceased" in 2002. "A significant number" of slaves were repatriated after 2005 the Comprehensive Peace Agreement of 2005, but "an unknown number" remain in captivity. The Institute created a "Sudan Abductee Database" containing "the names of over 11,000 people who were abducted in 20 years of slave-raiding" in Northern Bahr el-Ghazal state in southern Sudan, from 1983 to 2002. The January 2005 "North/South Comprehensive Peace Agreement (CPA)" peace treaty that ended the Sudanese civil war put an end to the slave raids, according to Christian Solidarity International, but did not provide a "way home for those already enslaved." The last Human Rights Watch "Backgrounder on Slavery in Sudan" was updated March 2002.

=== Christian Solidarity International slave redemption efforts ===
Efforts to "redeem" or to buy the freedom of slaves in Sudan are controversial. Beginning in 1995, Christian Solidarity International began "redeeming" slaves through an underground network of traders set up through local peace agreements between Arab and southern chiefs. The group claims to have freed over 80,000 people in this manner since that time. Several other charities eventually followed suit.

In 1999, UNICEF called the practice of redeeming slaves 'intolerable', arguing that these charities are implicitly accepting that human beings can be bought and sold.

UNICEF also said that buying slaves from slave-traders gives them cash to purchase arms and ammunition. But Christian Solidarity said they purchase slaves in Sudanese pounds, not US dollars that could be used to purchase arms.

As of 2015, Christian Solidarity International stated that it continues redeeming slaves. On its website, the group stated that it employs safeguards against fraud, and that allegations of fraud "remain today unsubstantiated".

== Legacy ==
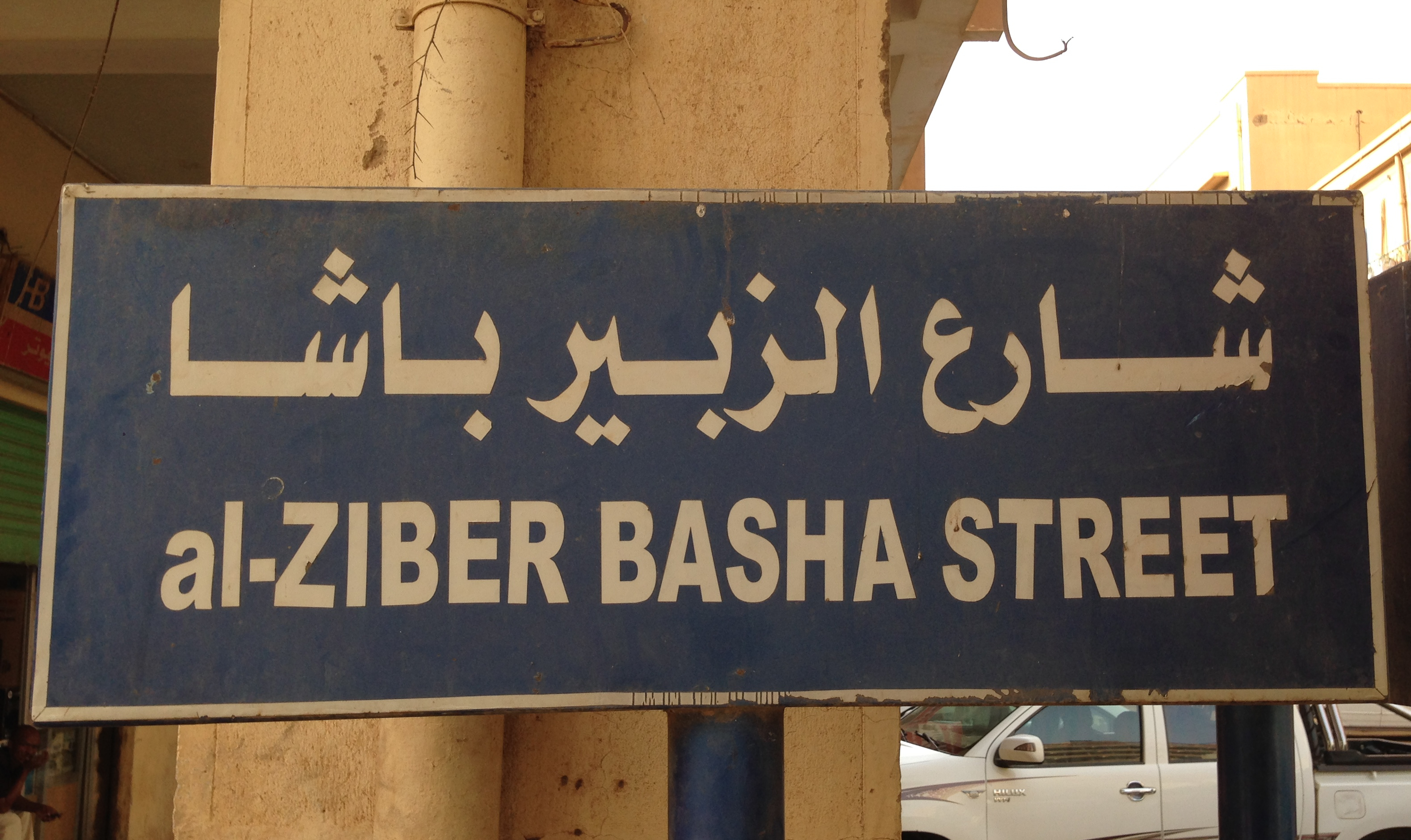
Ziber Basha Street in Khartoum

According to political scientist Amir Idris, the categorization of northern Sudanese as Arab and southern Sudanese as Black developed from the history of slavery and colonialism. Their legacy created a system of discrimination and racism. Idris also links the conflict in Darfur and the conflict that led to South Sudan's secession to this history.

According to historian Robert O. Collins, the racial prejudice that historically justified slavery in Sudan remains widespread, as reflected in the use of the Arabic word ʿabd (slave) as a derogatory term for people perceived as culturally different and socially or economically inferior. Anthropologist Carolyn Fluehr-Lobban identifies the use of this term by northern Sudanese to refer to southern Sudanese as a legacy of slavery.

In 2020, Al-Intibaha newspaper called a female football coach a slave. Glorification of past slave traders is common in Sudan. Slave trader al-Zubair Pasha Rahma has a street named after him in the capital.

== See also ==
- Slavery in modern Africa
- Mende Nazer
- Francis Bok
- Human rights in Sudan
- History of slavery in the Muslim world
- Slavery in ancient Egypt

== Sources ==
- Jok, Jok Madut (2001). War and Slavery in Sudan. University of Pennsylvania Press. ISBN 0-8122-1762-4.
