= Slavery in the Trucial States =

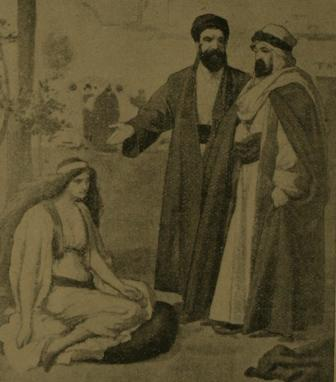
Slave market in 1907.

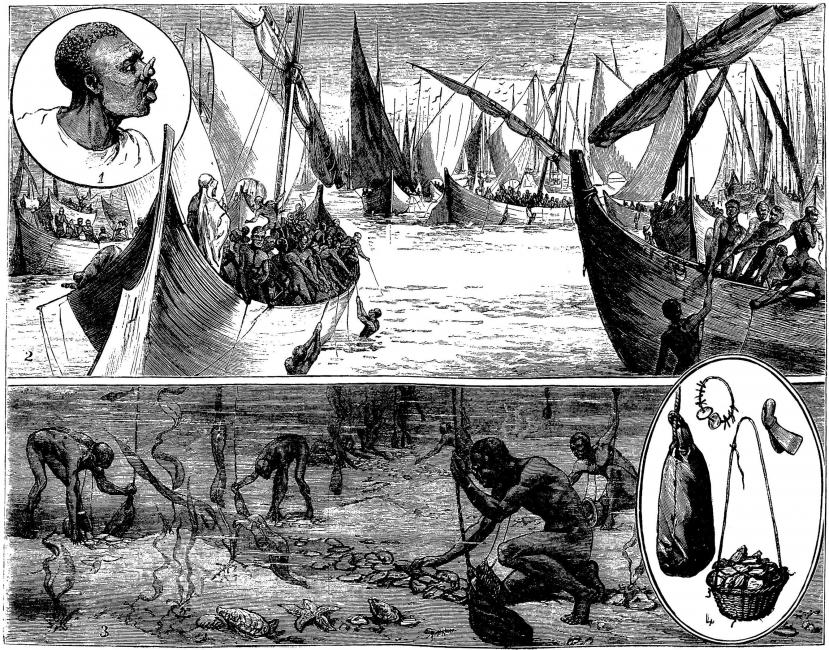
The Pearl Fishery in the Persian Gulf, an illustration for The Graphic in 1881. At the time, the pearl industry was dominated by African slave labor.

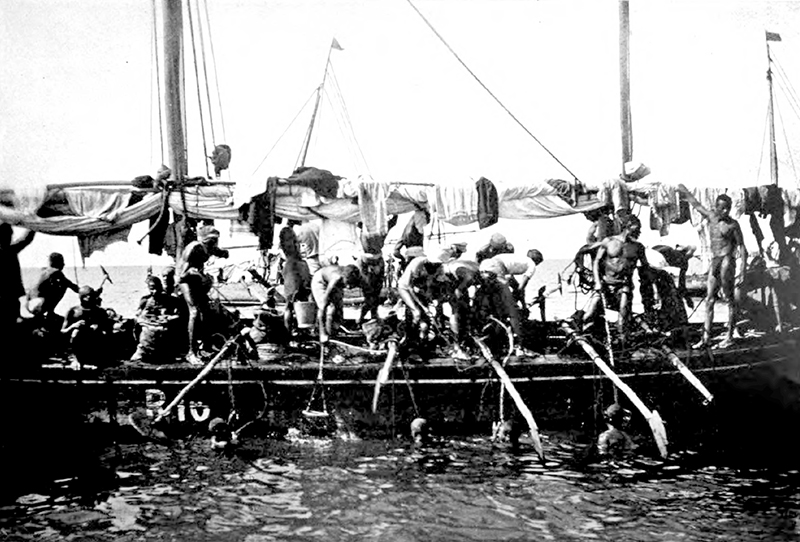
Pearl divers in the Persian Gulf. At the time, the pearl industry was dominated by slave labor.

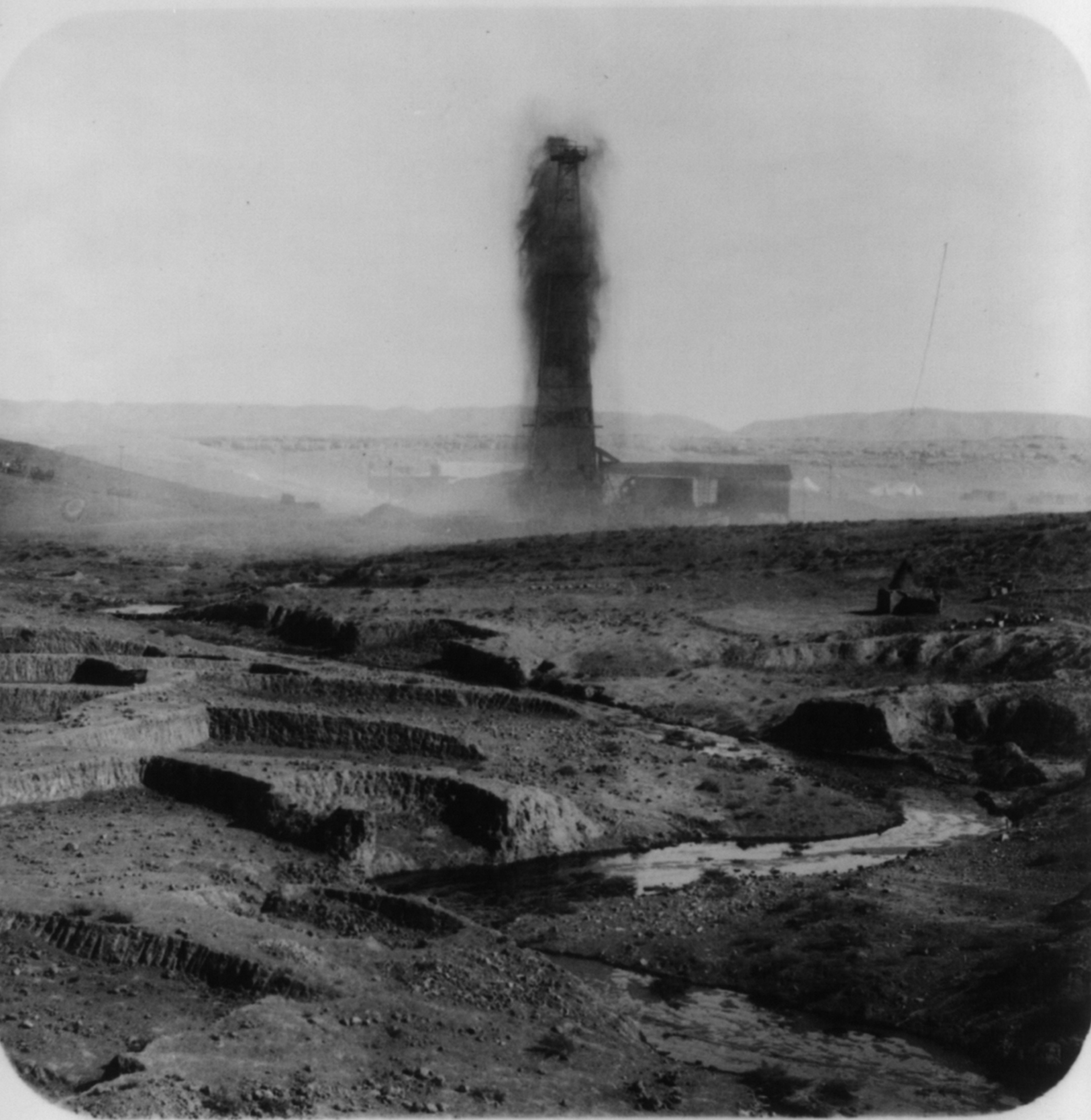
Oil field 1932. The British Foreign Office unsuccessfully asked the Iraq Petroleum Company not to use slave labor in the Gulf.

Chattel slavery existed in the Trucial States (1892–1971), which later formed the United Arab Emirates. The Trucial States consisted of the Sheikdoms Dubai, Abu Dhabi, Sharjah, Ajman, Umm Al Quwain, Fujairah, and Ras Al Khaimah. The region was mainly supplied with enslaved people from the Indian Ocean slave trade, but humans were also trafficked to the area from Oman and Persia. Slaves were used in the famous pearl fish industry and later in the oil industry, as well as sex slaves and domestic servants. Many members of the Afro-Arabian minority are descendants of the former slaves.

The year that the Trucial States officially abolished slavery is rather unclear. Some say that bondage was officially outlawed in 1963, when the Trucial rulers signed an agreement decreeing the abolition of slavery. Others say that it was in 1971, when the Trucial States joined the UN as the United Arab Emirates and accepted the UN's Conventions against slavery. However, the legislation around slavery remained unclear because the 1963 decree was never actually issued, and the UN law of 1971 was not obligatory. Slavery of people from Africa and East Asia was succeeded by the modern Kafala system of poor workers from the same region where slaves had previously been imported.

== History ==
Slavery and slave trade had been an issue of tension between Britain and the Gulf states since the abolition of slavery in Britain in 1833. While the British abolition of slavery never applied in the Trucial States because they were never colonies, the British fleet did oppose the Indian Ocean slave trade and prevented slave ships from Zanzibar to reach their destination in the Gulf. The British and the Trucial rulers signed treaties against the slave trade in 1839, 1847 and 1856, but the treaties was not respected in the Gulf states and British reports noted that Dubai was a big slave route for the trafficking of slaves to Saudi Arabia.

In the 1890s, the British Empire gained control over the area. They established the Trucial States in 1892. The British power over these states were managed via the India Office and their foreign policy and contact with the outside world through the Foreign Office. However, the British did not interfere with the inner policy of the Trucial States, but was content with keeping peace with the indigenous power holders, protecting British citizens, and managing the contacts between the Trucial States and the international community, in which they assured that the Trucial States obeyed the same international treaties signed by the British themselves. The British met a substantial slave trade in the area with old historic roots.

=== Slave trade ===
==== Indian Ocean ====
During the Omani Empire (1692–1856), Oman was a center of the Zanzibar slave trade. Slaves were trafficked from the Swahili coast of East Africa via Zanzibar to Oman. From Oman, the slaves were exported to the rest of the Arabian Peninsula and Persia, including the Trucial States, Qatar, Bahrain and Kuwait. The Omani slave trade from Africa started to shrink in the late 19th-century, but a second slave trade from Africa via Hejaz continued. The historical records show that most slaves in the pearl industry of the Persian Gulf were shipped from either the East African Swahili Coast or the Horn of Africa.

==== Hajj ====
A second route of slave trade existed, with people from both Africa and East Asia, who were smuggled to Jeddah in the Arabian Peninsula in connection to the Muslim pilgrimage, Hajj, to Mecca and Medina. These slaves were imported from the Hejaz to Oman, the Trucial States, Qatar, Bahrain and Kuwait. Victims were tricked to perform the journey willingly in the belief that they were going on the Hajj pilgrimage or employed as servants and then sold upon arrival. The method of kidnapping was also used.

==== India ====
In 1927, a trial revealed a slave trade organization in which Indian children of both sexes were trafficked to Oman and Dubai via Persia and Gwadar.

==== Baluchistan ====
In the 1940s, a third slave trade route was noted, in which individuals from Balochistan were shipped across the Persian Gulf, many of whom had sold themselves or their children to escape poverty.

==== Buraimi ====
The Buraimi Oasis was a staging post in a neutral border zone, mutually administered by Britain and Saudi Arabia and manned by Trucial Scouts, an Arab force with British officers.

When the British patrolling against slave ships on sea became more effective against the Red Sea slave trade and the Indian Ocean slave trade, slaves started to be imported by aircraft. A report by a British officer in Buraimi informed the Anti-Slavery International that 2,000 slaves annually were trafficked from West Africa to Buraimi via three aircraft per month. These flights arrived unofficially during nighttime and officially claimed to transport exclusively military supplies and military personnel, and when questioned about civilian passengers they stated that these were residents of Buraimi, arriving to visiting relatives.

The duties of the Trucial Oman Scouts (TOL) as of 1951 were to (1) maintain peace and good order on the Trucial States; (2) prevent or suppress any traffic of slaves (but not slavery itself as this was considered an 'internal affair' by the British); and (3) provide an escort for any British political representative traveling in the Trucial States. The first major achievement of the Levies was the cessation of both the Buraimi slave trade into Saudi Arabia and abductions into slavery, especially in the area of the Buraimi Oasis, and by the end of 1951 this trade had reportedly ceased. In practice, however, these people were trafficked from Buraimi to the slave markets in Saudi Arabia until the air flight slave trade was banned by Prince Feisal in 1962.

==== Ethnicity ====
The vast majority of slaves were of African origin, but there were also a minority from Asia and Europe. Of 283 female slaves who applied for manumission from their Arab owners at the British Agency in Sharjah, 151 were African (25 from Eastern Africa, 8 from Sudan, 2 from Somalia, and 126 born in Arabia by African slave parents), and of the remaining number, 46 were from Baluchistan, all of them having been captured and trafficked in their own lifetime and not born in slavery.

=== Function and conditions ===
Slaves were given a new name on arrival. Men's names symbolized affluence and power, and women were given vibrant names that conveyed femininity. They gradually integrated in to the local culture, gradually forgetting their past; freed slaves normally by culture stayed in the household or in a clientship of their former owners.

Female slaves were often used for sexual services as concubines for a period of time, and then sold or married off to other slaves; the slave owners would arranged both marriages and divorce for their slaves, and the offspring of two slaves would become slaves in turn. It was common for slave owners to claim sexual services of married female slaves when the slave husband was away for long periods of time, to hunt for pearls or fish or similar labour, and sexual abuse was a common reason given when female slaves applied for manumission at the British Agency. It was common for Arab men to use the sexual services of enslaved African women, but a male African slave who had sexual relations with a local "pure blood" Arab woman would be executed to preserve tribal honour and social status, regardless if the couple had married or not.

==== Male slaves ====
Male slaves where used in a number of tasks: as soldiers, pearl divers, farm labourers, cash crop workers, maritime sailors, dock workers, porters, irrigation canal workers, fishermen, and domestic servants.

In the seventeenth and eighteenth centuries European travellers frequently noted African slave soldiers and African eunuchs at the royal courts.

In the nineteenth-century, the slave trade experienced the greatest peak since the ninth-century, a thousand years earlier, because of the great growth of the pearling industry in the international world trade, which relied heavily on African slave labour.

The British urged the Trucial states not to use slave labour in the oil industries, but the Trucial rulers answered that it would be difficult to find labour to the oil industry unless slave labour was used, and the British had difficulty in controlling whether the laborers in the oil industry were slaves or free workers.

The British Foreign Office repeatedly and unsuccessfully asked the Iraq Petroleum Company not to employ slaves, but was met with the reply that it was the responsibility of the shaykhs to supply the workers. In the 1950s, a high percentage of oil workers in Abu Dhabi were slaves.

==== Female slaves ====
Female slaves were primarily used as either domestic servants, or as concubines (sex slaves).

The sex slave-concubines of rich urban men who had given birth to the son of their enslaver were counted as the most privileged, since they became an Umm Walad and became free upon the death of their enslaver; the concubine of a Bedouin mainly lived the same life as the rest of the tribal members and the women of the family. Female domestic slaves lived a hard life and reproduction among slaves was low; it was noted that the infant mortality was high among slaves, and that female slaves were often raped in their childhood and rarely lived in their forties, and that poorer slave owners often prostituted them.

Black African women were primarily used as domestic house slaves rather than exclusively for sexual services, while white Caucasian women (normally Circassian or Georgian) were preferred as concubines (sex slaves), and when the main slave route of white slave girls via the Black Sea slave trade and the Kazakh Khanate slave trade was reduced after Russia's conquest of the Caucasus and Central Asia in the mid nineteenth-century, Baluchi and "Red" Ethiopian (Oromo and Sidamo) women became the preferred targets for sexual slavery. Non-African female slaves were sold in the Persian Gulf where they were bought for marriage; these were fewer and often Armenian, Georgian, or from Baluchistan and India. In 1943, it was reported that Baloch girls were shipped via Oman and the Trucial States to Mecca, where they were popular as concubines, since Caucasian (Circassian) girls were no longer available, and were sold for $350–450.

The Temporary Slavery Commission (TSC) of the League of Nations in 1925 had particularly specified that concubines also had the right to freedom, but the British where particularly reluctant to enforce anti slavery legislation when it came to the harem concubines of the Muslims since they did not wish to arouse anger by interfering in such sensitive domestic issues and often avoided addressing the emancipation of slave concubines by defining the concubines as wives and thus not in fact slaves.

The number of female slaves in the Gulf was as high or higher than that of male slaves, but the number of female slaves who made applications for manumission at the British Agencies in the Gulf was significantly lower (only 280 of 950 documented cases in 1921–1946), likely because in the Islamic society of the Gulf, were women were excluded from wage labour and public life, it was impossible for a freedwoman to survive without a male protector.

Female slaves were also given as gifts between rulers: in November 1948, for example, the ruler of Dubai gifted a number of female slaves to king Ibn Saud and his sons, receiving in return a car and 10,000 ryals.

== Activism against slave trade ==
=== 1892–1950 ===
The British Empire, having signed the 1926 Slavery Convention as a member of the League of Nations, was obliged to fight slavery and the slave trade in all land under the direct or indirect control of the British Empire. Since the Trucial States were informally a British protectorate, the British were expected by the League of Nations to enforce this policy in the region. Officially, the British declared that they did just that, but in reality, the slavery and slave trade in the Trucial States were tolerated by the British.

As was the case with the rest of the Gulf states, the British considered their control over the region insufficient to do much about slavery and the slave trade. The British India Office advised the British authorities that any attempts to enforce an anti-slavery treaty in the region could cause economic and political unrest, since slavery was "deeply rooted in religious and political history". The British policy was therefore to assure the League of Nations that the region followed the same anti slavery treaties signed by the British, but in parallel prevent any international observations of the area, which would disprove these claims.

The British India Office, responsible also for the Gulf region, officially reported that the British agents had anti-slavery treaties with the indigenous rulers of all the Trucial States, Muscat and Bahrain, except for Kuwait.

The British publicly burned a slave dhow in Dubai as a warning in 1928 and the shaykhs, particularly the shaykh of Qatar, expressed themselves willing to enforce the formal treaty obligations; but in reality, this was impossible, and the British reported that the indigenous authorities were "fanatical, backward, and intensely suspicious of any European interference, which they regard as a threat to their liberties".

In both 1932 and 1935, the British colonial authorities refused to interfere in the slavery of the Trucial States, Qatar, Bahrain and Kuwait, since they were afraid that they could lose control over the area if they should attempt to enforce a policy against slavery, and they therefore prevented all international observation of the area which could force them to take action. In 1932, the official report of the India Office to the Committee of Experts on Slavery that the British agents in the Trucial states regularly participated in the manumission of slaves in the British diplomatic offices, and had managed to press down the slave trade to a minimum.

As late as 1935, the British authorities thus assured the Advisory Committee of Experts on Slavery of the League of Nations that the Trucial States, Qatar, Bahrain and Kuwait had banned all slave trading in the region in treaties with the British, while at the same time, the British refused any international inspections in the region which would have revealed that a substantial slave trade was in fact going on, especially within the pearl fishing industry, where the slaves were particularly harshly treated.

In 1936, the British finally acknowledged to the Advisory Committee of Experts on Slavery of the League of Nations that there was still ongoing slavery and a slave trade in the Trucial States, Oman and Qatar, but claimed that it was limited, and that all slaves who sought asylum at the British Agents Office in Sharjah were granted manumission. In reality, the British reports were deliberately playing down the size of the actual substantial slave trade going on in the region. In the 1940s, there were several suggestions made by the British to combat the slave trade and the slavery in the region, but none was considered enforceable by the British authorities.

Many slaves used the opportunity to seek refuge and manumission at the British Agents Office in Sharjah. The fugitive slaves recorded their testimonies to the British Agents Office, which related their slave narrative. One such example were:

Statement made by Ismail bin Mubarak, aged about 22 years. Recorded at Sharjah on the 12th October 1939. "My mother Tuffaha was originally from Suwahil (South East Africa) and was bought by Fatimah bint Sharif of Ras al Khaima. Fatimah got my mother married and I was born. She then manumitted my mother who remained in her service as a free women and not a slave. When Fatimah died my mother started serving Ali al Sharif, brother of Fatimah. I was brought up in Ali’s house and when my age was 15 he started sending me diving with different people. He took my earnings. Three months ago when I was at the diving bank Ali al Sharif died. On return my mother informed me of Ali’s death and also told me that Ayshah, sister of Ali, intends to sell me and my mother on the ground that we were slaves of her brother. As my mother had no manumission certificates from Fatimah I ran away from Ras al Khaima to Sharjah in order to take refuge at the Government House and beg to be released from slavery".

=== 1950–1970 ===
After World War II, there was a growing international pressure from the United Nations to end the slave trade. After the Independence of India in 1947, the British Foreign Office secured direct control over the Trucial States and for the first time considered itself to have sufficient control to enforce the laws against slavery and slave trade, particularly since a bigger international presence in the Gulf States attracted more attention to the slavery, and a stronger international condemnation against it.

In 1948, the United Nations declared slavery to be a crime against humanity in the Universal Declaration of Human Rights, after which the Anti-Slavery Society pointed out that there were about one million slaves in the Arabian Peninsula, which was a crime against the 1926 Slavery Convention, and demanded that the UN form a committee to handle the issue. The UN formed the Ad Hoc Committee on Slavery in 1950, which resulted in the introduction of the Supplementary Convention on the Abolition of Slavery. The Ad Hoc Committee on Slavery filed a report on the chattel slavery in the Trucial States during the 1950-1951 investigation.

In 1951 the British founded the Trucial Oman Levies or Trucial Oman Scouts in Sharjah to fight the slave trade.

When slavery in Qatar was abolished in 1952 the British asked the Trucial Council assembly of Trucial rulers to follow their example and abolish slavery, but they refused, stating that slavery was legal in Islam, and that they lacked the funds to pay compensation to slave owners.

The 1956 Supplementary Slavery Convention differed between "non-self-governing territories" and "other non-metropolitan territories" such as the Persian Gulf states, and the British stated that the Convention did not apply to the Trucial states, but encouraged the Trucial rulers to abolish slavery and apply the Convention voluntarily.

In 1957 the British pressured the Gulf rulers to accept the 1956 Supplementary Slavery Convention in accordance with the Colonial Application; this was accepted by Kuwait, Qatar and Bahrain, but the rulers of the Trucial States stated that such a law could not be enforced. When the Trucial rulers did accept the 1956 Supplementary Slavery Convention, they did not follow it up with issuing the necessary edicts, and the British regarded the issue as too sensitive to pressure them to do so.

In 1958 the British Political Agent in Dubai Peter Tripp urged the Trucial rulers to issue a decree, a'lan, to prohibit slavery and fulfil the obligations of the 1956 Supplementary Slavery Convention. The Trucial rulers claimed that slavery was already defunct but that they would issue such a decree if the British government wished them to. In 1963, the British Political Resident Sir William Luce reported that the Trucial rulers had finally signed an agreement to issue a decree to follow the 1956 Supplementary Slavery Convention; they claimed that they had indeed issued such a decree, but the British could find no evidence to confirm that such a decree had ever been issued.

== After independence: the United Arab Emirates ==
On 2 December 1971 the Trucial States became independent under the new name United Arab Emirates and was accepted as a member of the United Nations. As such, they also accepted the Universal Declaration of Human Rights prohibiting slavery, however this carried no obligations to follow the Declaration, and there was a lack of clarity as to whether slavery was actually illegal in the Emirates.

Many Afro-Arabians in the UAE are descendants of the former slaves. Former slaves were given citizenship in 1971, and genetic studies reveal that the population of certain regions of the Persian Gulf have a significance of West African haplotypes.

Slaves were considered as members of the tribes and the families to which they were enslaved. After the abolishment of slavery, freed slaves were given the option to adopt the surname of the tribes they served, many former slaves were granted Emirati citizenship in 1971.

=== Modern slavery ===
In the United Arab Emirates, the labor previously performed by slaves were now performed by poor migrant workers employed under the Kafala system, which has been compared to slavery. The Kafala laborers often came from Africa and Asia, just as the majority of the former slaves.

Another form of modern slavery came in the form of human trafficking for sexual exploitation. When the Soviet Union broke up, thousands of Eastern European women become prostitutes in China, Western Europe, Israel, and Turkey every year. There are tens of thousands of women from Eastern Europe and Asia working as prostitutes in Dubai. Men from Saudi Arabia and the United Arab Emirates form a large proportion of the customers.

==== Kafala system ====
The United Arab Emirates has a work visa sponsorship system to issue work permits for foreign nationals who wish to migrate for work in the UAE. Most of the visas are sponsored by institutions and companies. A person looking to enter the UAE for work obtains a work permit, valid for two months, from the Ministry of Human Resources. The sponsor is responsible for medical testing and obtaining identity cards, documents and stamps. The employee can then sponsor his or her family members and bring them into the UAE. By Article 1 of Ministerial Decree No. 766 of 2015, an employee whose contract expires can obtain a new permit and may remain in the UAE on a 6-month job seeker visa. A new work permit is also issued if the employer fails legal and contractual obligations such as not paying wages for 60 days. A worker may request his contract to be terminated after at least 6 months of employment. A worker whose employment is terminated unfairly has the right to receive a new work permit without the six-month condition.

In the United Arab Emirates, the kafala system was part of the 1980 Federal Law on the Regulation of Labour Relations, which regulated the relationship between the state, the sponsor and the sponsored. The law did not require any written contract to be drawn up between the employer and the migrant worker. Migrant workers required the permission of their employers to change employment and the provided sponsorship could not be transferred to another employer. The 1980 Law did regulate issues such as severance pay, repatriation pay, annual leave, standards for maximum working hours and working conditions, payment for overtime and the payment for treatment of labor-related injuries. However, the law also prohibited labor unions and strikes.

Labor law reforms were introduced in the UAE in 2016, which included a standardized offer letter prepared by the UAE's Ministry of Labor, a standardized work contract which must specify duration, nature of the work, place of employment, wages and remuneration. The changes also specify working hours as 8 hours per day or 48 hours per week. However, these working hours could be higher for those working in the service industry. Furthermore, migrant workers are allowed to change employers after six months, but only if their employer consents, or if employment is not provided or if a legal complaint of some sort is issued. Both parties can agree to end the employment contract after six months. According to the reforms, contracts must be made available in both Arabic, English and a third language if required. Employers who fail to provide translations are subjected to fines.

Per UAE Federal law No. 6 of 1973 on the Entry and Residence of aliens, an employer may not deny an employee on a work visa right to an annual leave, regular paid wage, 45 days maternity leave, right to resign, resign gratuity, and a 30-day grace period to find a new job. An employer may not confiscate an employee's passport, force the employee to pay for his residency visa fees, or force the employee to work more than 8 hours a day or 45 hours a week without compensation. An employee who wishes to leave needs to complete their legal notice period, which is usually 30 days or less, before leaving their job or risk being banned to work in UAE for up to one year. Alien widows or divorced women whose legal presence in the country was sponsored by their husband's work status are given a 1-year visa to stay in the country without the need for a work permit or a sponsor.

== See also ==
- Migrant workers in the United Arab Emirates
- Human trafficking in the United Arab Emirates
- Human rights in the United Arab Emirates#Migrant workers
- History of slavery in the Muslim world
- History of concubinage in the Muslim world
- Slavery in Saudi Arabia
- Human trafficking in the Middle East
