= Slavery in Yemen =

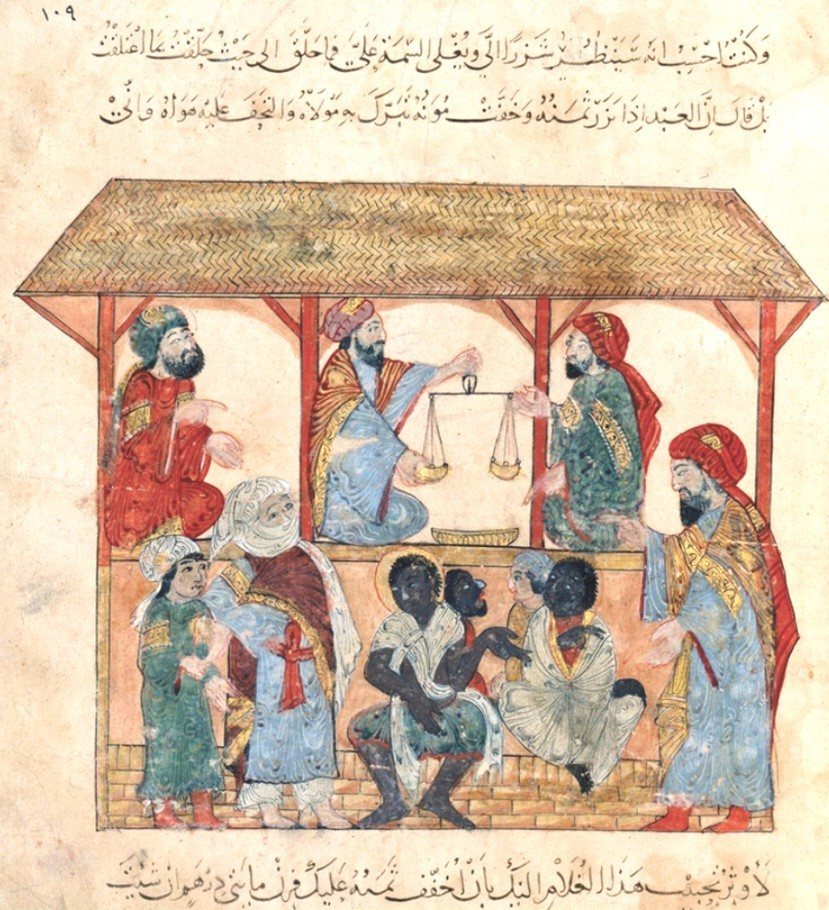
A 13th-century slave market in Yemen.

Slavery in Yemen (Arabic: العبودية في اليمن) was formally abolished in the 1960s. However, it has been reported that enslavement still occurred in the 21st century.

Chattel slavery in Yemen was abolished in two stages between 1962 and 1967. The 1962 revolution in Yemen led to the abolition of slavery by the government in North Yemen, but slavery in South Yemen was not abolished until the socialist National Liberation Front (NLF) took power when the British left in 1967. Al-Muhamashīn are descendants of the former slaves.

Yemen is in Arabia, and is a mostly Arab country. Yemen is considered a developing country, and has been in a state of political crisis since 2011. It was reported that at least 85,000 people were enslaved in Yemen in 2022, and due to the impossibility of conducting further surveys in the midst of the ongoing civil war, this number may be underestimated. The Houthis have been accused of restoring slavery in Yemen.

Not unlike previous times, slaves are inherited by their owners through family, as well as being bought and sold. The slaves are under complete control of their owners, an example of this being that although sometimes the slaves are allowed to marry one another, they are not allowed a ceremony, and are only allowed to see each other during an emergency or at night when their owner does not require them. In a sense, slavery has been formally recognised in Yemen, through a judge in the Courts confirming the transfer of a slave from one owner to another. This caused an outcry by the community and the media, which allegedly was quickly hushed up by the government.

== History of slavery ==
Historically, the institution of slavery in the region of the later Yemen was reflected in the institution of slavery in the Rashidun Caliphate (632–661) slavery in the Umayyad Caliphate (661–750), and slavery in the Abbasid Caliphate (750–1258).

=== Slave trade to Yemen ===
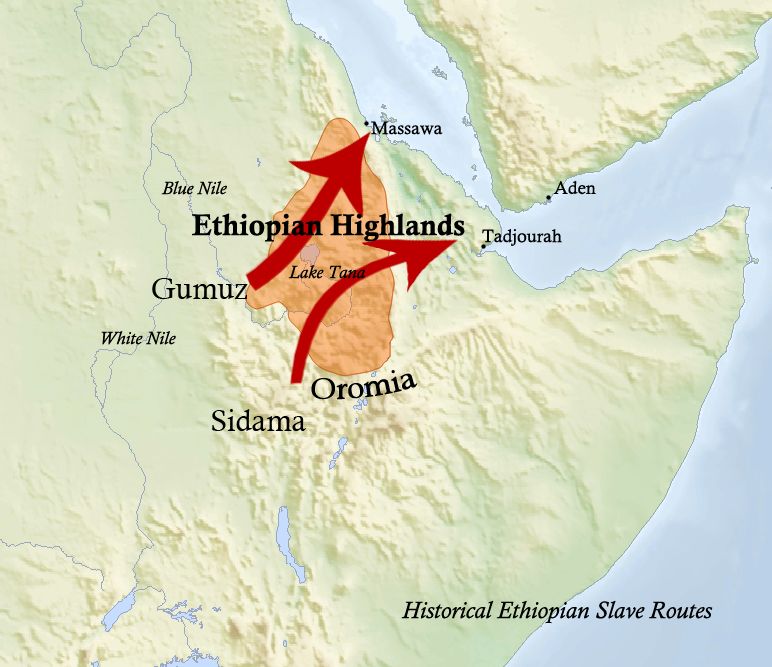
Slave trade routes through Ethiopia

The Red Sea slave trade appears to have been established at least in the 1st-century, when enslaved Africans from the Horn of Africa were trafficked across the Red Sea to Arabia and Yemen.

In the Middle Ages, the majority of slaves appeared to have been of African origin, but there were also enslaved people of other origins, such as Indians, Europeans and Turkish people, as well as an illegal enslavement of Muslim Arabs despite the fact that Islamic rules banned the enslavement of other Muslims.

A tribute of 1000 slaves were annually sent from the Dahlak Archipelago to Yemen, made up of what appeared to have been Nubian or Ethiopian slaves. In the 12th-century, Muhammad al-Idrisi trafficked African children from present day Kenya to Arabia, and a slave trade is confirmed to have taken place from present day Somalia to Aden in Yemen at that point. During the 13th-century Indian boys, as well Indian women and girls intended for sex slavery, were trafficked from India to Arabia and to Egypt via Aden.

In the 13th-century, Ibn al-Mujāwir, traveler in Yemen, recorded a graphic description of the procedures on the slave market of Aden:

The slave girl is fumigated with an aromatic smoke, perfumed, adorned and a waist-wrapper fastened round her middle. The seller takes her by the hand and walks around the souk [market] with her; he calls out that she is for sale. The wicked merchants appear, examining her hands, feet, calves, thighs, navel, chest and breasts. He examines her back and measures her buttocks in spans. He examines her tongue, teeth, hair and spares no effort. If she is wearing clothes, he takes them off; he examines and looks. Finally, he casts a direct eye over her vagina and anus, without her having on any covering or veil. When he has examined, expressed his approval and bought the slave girl, she remains with him for about ten days. When [the buyer] has taken care of her, had his fill, become bored and tired of her and got what he wanted from her, his lust is at an end. Zayd, the buyer, says to ʿAmr, the vendor, "Indeed, sir, we have a case to settle in court!" So they attend in front of the judge and one makes a claim against the other, [suggesting there is] a defect [in the slave girl].

Yemeni Rasulid sources mention that Abyssinian concubines and eunuchs brought to Yemen were Jazli, Amhara and Saharti (Tigrayans). Habesha slaves were priced at roughly twice the value of Zanji slaves.

These Habesha mamluks often rose to positions of power in Yemen. The Jazli seized power from the Ziyadids and established the Najahid dynasty, Faraj al-Saharti and Surur al-Amhari ruled successively as Wazirs of Zabid between 1133 and 1157 and other Habeshas participated in the state as military leaders such as Ishaq bin Marzuq al-Saharti.

In the 1760s the Yemeni Hadhrami Arab Syarif Abdurrahman Alkadrie mass enslaved other Muslims while raiding coastal Borneo in violation of sharia, before he founded the Pontianak Sultanate.

In the 19th century, slaves were exported from the Eritrean and Somali coast to Yemen. In 1876, large numbers of slaves were reportedly being exported from the Somali port of Zeila to Hodeida in Yemen. A French traveller writing from Zeila in 1881 noted that most of the slaves found there were Oromo women captured as prisoners of war. French explorer Edmond Combes found what he described as "a large number of Oromo slaves" in Yemen. In the 1850s, the Afar people from the Eritrean and Djibouti coasts brought Oromo slaves to Mokha. Slaves were also exported from Massawa to Mokha and Hodeida, according to the British Captain Haines:

"The slaves are brought from Mussowa to Mocha, Hodeida and Jedda, in native boats under red colors, when they have again to pay an import duty of one German Crown per head, and an export duty of half a German Crown. I have seen as many as 2 and 300 a month arrive at Mocha. On landing they were immediately placed within a compound, unclothed, from whence they were driven to a well for water, twice a day, like a flock of sheep, their food consisting of jowaree cake and some sugar-cane."

By 1900, although King Menelik of Ethiopia had outlawed the open trade in slaves in Ethiopia, Oromo slaves were still being sold in large numbers in Yemen.

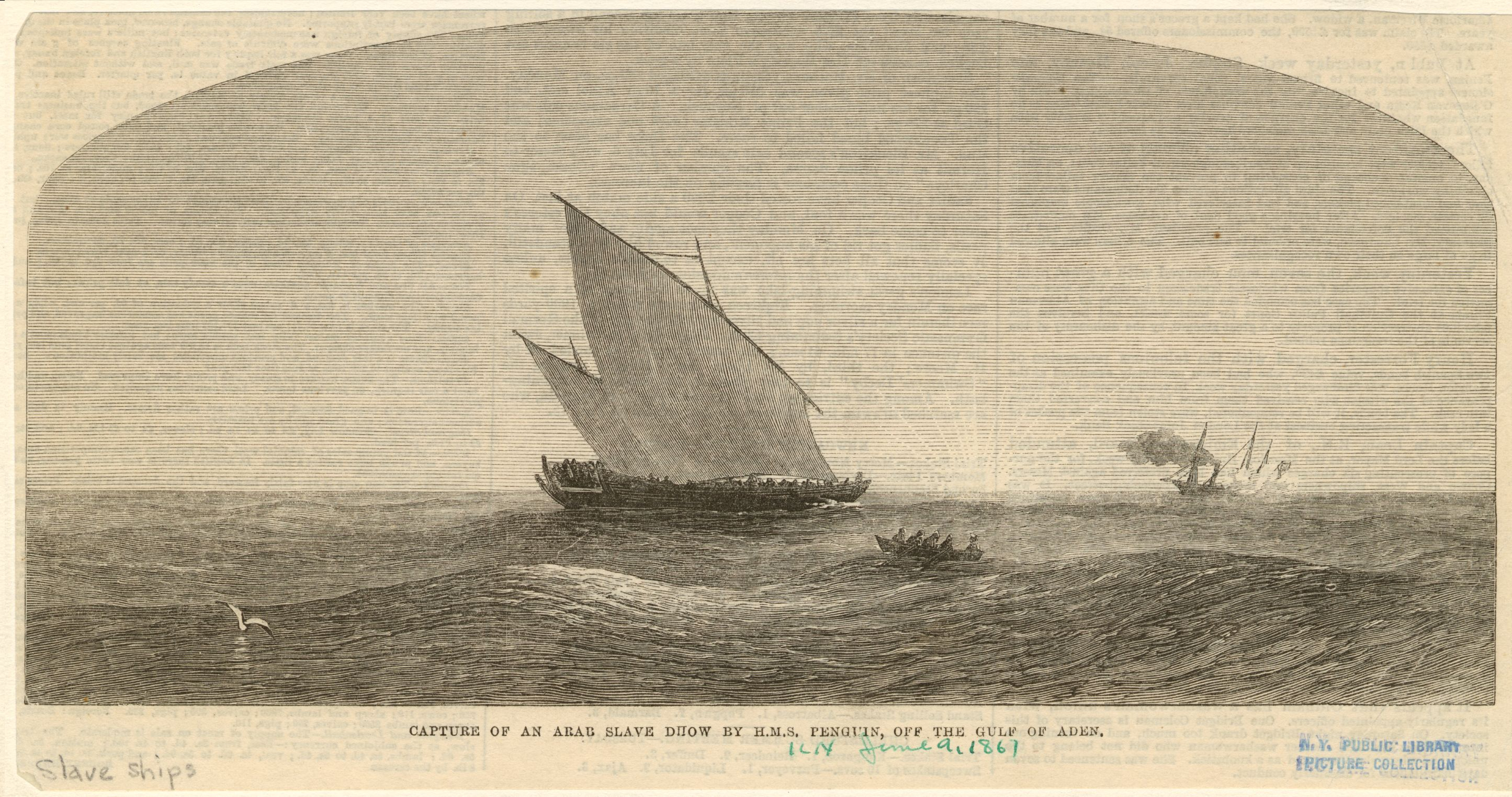
Capture of a slave dhow by HMS Penguin off the Gulf of Aden

In 1869 the Royal Navy was enforcing a ban on slave trading in the Gulf of Aden and intercepted over 100 Galla slaves that were illegally shipped to Aden from Berbera. Soon after more slaves were discovered at Siyara and Lieutenant Colonel Playfair with the steamer 'Lady Canning' implored the Makahil elders to surrender the slaves. Upon their refusal the Lady Canning would open fire shooting deliberately near the important fort of Siyara. This act of intimidation led the elders to oblige and free the slaves held in the area.

The port town was later on described as being under the possession of the Habr Je'lo:

The last branch of the Western tribes is the Haber el Jahleh, who possess the seaports from Seyareh to the ruined village of Rukudah, and as far as the town of Heis. Of these towns, Kurrum is the most important, from its possessing a tolerable harbour, and from its being the nearest point from Aden, the course to which place is N.N.W., consequently the wind is fair, and the boats laden with sheep for the Aden market pass but one night at sea, whilst those from Berbera are generally three. What greatly enhances the value of Kurrum however is its proximity to the country of the Dulbahanta, who approach within four days of Kurrum, and who therefore naturally have their chief trade through that port.

=== Function and conditions of slavery ===
The function of slavery differed depending on if the enslaved person was male, female or a eunuch.

==== Female slaves ====
Women were primarily enslaved as harem concubines (sex slaves) or as domestic house slaves. The female slaves owned by women could be used for a number of domestic household chores, while women owned by men were exploited sexually and used as both sex slaves (concubines) as well as entertainers.

In the early Middle Ages, there were also a minority of slave girls who were trained to become qiyan artist courtesans or slave singing girls. This custom was still ongoing in the 12th century, when the female slave artists performed in public in front of a male audience, and were essentially prostituted by way of frequently being sold from one male client to the next.

Many of the Imams of Yemen were the sons of slave-girls, and this custom continued until the 20th century. In the 1960s, the King and Imam of Yemen, Ahmad bin Yahya (r. 1948-1962) were reported to have had a harem of 100 slave women.

==== Male slaves ====
Eunuchs were the most expensive slaves. In the Middle Ages they mainly came from Africa and underwent the dangerous operation in Ethiopia before being imported to Yemen. Eunuchs were bought by aristocrats and royalty and could be given a number of different assignments: as administrators and agents of the affairs of the harem and royal women, as teachers and caretakers of children, and as supervisors of the rest of the slaves.

Male slaves who were not eunuchs were employed as laborers or as slave soldiers (Mamluks).

Mamluk soldiers were introduced in Yemen during the Ziyadid dynasty (818-981). From the 9th-century onward they were a permanent institution in Yemen; initially the Mamluk soldiers were of Ethiopian, Nubian and Turkish origin, but during the Rasulid dynasty (1229-1454) onward they appear to have been of primarily Turkish ethnicity thus provided from the Bukhara slave trade.

=== Activism against slavery ===
Part of Yemen was controlled by the British Empire in the 19th- and 20th-century. The city of Aden formed the Aden Settlement (1839–1932), Province (1932-1937), and Colony (1937–1963), while the hinterland formed the Aden Protectorate (1872-1963), Federation of the Emirates of South Arabia (1959-1962), Federation of South Arabia (1962-1967), and Protectorate of South Arabia (1963-1967); Aden joined the Federation in 1963.

When the League of Nations was founded, they conducted an international investigation of slavery via the Temporary Slavery Commission (TSC), and a convention was drawn up to hasten the total abolition of slavery and the slave trade. Aden admitted in their report to the Temporary Slavery Commission (TSC) of 1924-1926 that there was still chattel slavery in Yemen. The 1926 Slavery Convention, which was founded upon the investigation of the TSC of the League of Nations, was a turning point in banning global slavery.

The British Empire, having signed the 1926 Slavery Convention, was obliged to fight slavery and slave trade in all land under direct or indirect control of the British Empire. However, the British control of Yemen was not complete even in the part of Yemen which was nominally controlled by them. The Aden Protectorate was divided into an Eastern Protectorate and a Western Protectorate. Those were further divided into 23 sultanates and emirates, and several independent tribes that had no relationships with the native states. The deal between the native states and Britain detailed protection and complete control of foreign relations by the British. This limited their actual power to do something about slavery.

In 1932, the League of Nations asked all member countries to include anti-slavery commitment in any treaties they made with all Arab states. In 1932 the League formed the Committee of Experts on Slavery (CES) to review the result and enforcement of the 1926 Slavery Convention, which resulted in a new international investigation under the first permanent slavery committee, the Advisory Committee of Experts on Slavery (ACE) in 1934-1939.

In 1934, Freya Stark sailed down the Red Sea to Aden in the hope to reach the ancient city of Shabwa, which was rumoured to have been the capital of the Queen of Sheba. Although she never reached Shabwa, she was able to travel extensively and recount many experiences. Stark returned to the region later for additional trips. During these journeys, she encountered slavery in Yemen, which according to a New Yorker profile caused a "moral predicament",. Stark reasoned that slavery seemed to decline in less religious societies, and thus she felt that slavery would decline in Arabia as it evolved. She published her account of the region in three books, The Southern Gates of Arabia: A Journey in the Hadhramaut (1936), Seen In The Hadhramaut (1938) and A Winter in Arabia (1940).

In 1936, the British authorities in Aden filed a report about the slavery in Yemen. The British report told of 5,000 to 10,000 slaves in a population of three million. Most of the slaves were either trafficked from Africa, or born to enslaved Africans in Yemen, and a small minority of the slaves were Caucasian. Most of the male slaves were Africans, occupied in agricultural work or as soldiers. Egypt and Hejaz were also the recipients of Indian women trafficked via Aden and Goa. Since Britain banned the slave trade in its colonies, 19th century British ruled Aden was no longer officially a recipient of slaves and the slaves sent from Ethiopia to Arabia were shipped to Hejaz instead.

Slavery in Yemen were given attention in the Advisory Committee of Experts on Slavery (ACE). The report to ACE about Hadhramaut described the existence of Chinese girls (Mui tsai) trafficked from Singapore for enslavement as concubines, Indian women trafficked to Hadrhamaut to be sold by their husbands, and Indian children officially taken there for religious studies, only to be sold upon arrival. The British tried to convince the coastal local rulers of the Aden Protectorate to sign an agreement to ban the slave trade, but by January 1939, few had done so.

The British, obliged by the 1926 Slavery Convention to abolish all practice of slavery in the British Empire, did not abolish the slavery as an institution in Yemen, but managed to free many slaves by buying them, manumitting them, and relocating them within the British Empire.

==== Abolition of slavery ====
The worldwide abolition of slavery began in the seventeenth and eighteenth centuries, when the Declaration of the Rights of Man was adopted in 1789, and stated "men are born and remain free and equal in rights." By the nineteenth century, an increasing number of countries such as The Netherlands were banning participation with the African Slave Trade, and soon after abolished slavery in all of its colonies, along with France. By the 1900s, abolition of slavery was spreading globally, with countries such as Burma and Sierra Leone following the movement.

After World War II, there was a growing international pressure from the United Nations to end the slave trade in the Arabian Peninsula. In 1948, the United Nations declared slavery to be a crime against humanity in the Universal Declaration of Human Rights (DHR), after which the Anti-Slavery Society pointed out that there were about one million slaves in the Arabian Peninsula, which was a crime against the 1926 Slavery Convention, and demanded that the UN form a committee to handle the issue. The UN formed the Ad Hoc Committee on Slavery in 1950, which resulted in the introduction of the Supplementary Convention on the Abolition of Slavery. The Ad Hoc Committee on Slavery filed a report on the chattel slavery in Yemen during the 1950-1951 investigation.

In the 1950s, in connection to the Ad Hoc Committee on Slavery and the Supplementary Convention on the Abolition of Slavery, Barnett Janner described Saudi Arabia and Yemen as the only remaining states where slavery was still a legal institution:

The shipping of slaves occurs in only one particular area of the world, in the seas around Arabia. The warships most likely to search such slavers would be British, and I feel sure that there would not be any abuse of the right to search. I am sorry that we gave up the fight for that right. As far as I know, Saudi Arabia and Yemen are the only States in the world where chattel slavery is still a legal institution. Only a year or so ago a French Deputy—the person, I assume, to whom my hon. Friend referred—investigated the situation and found that every year ignorant Africans are lured on by agents to make a pilgrimage to Mecca. They are not told, of course, that they need a Saudi Arabian visa. When they arrive in Saudi Arabia without a visa they are arrested and put into prison for a few days and then handed over to licensed slave dealers. In addition, raids are made in Baluchistan and the Sheikdoms of the Persian Gulf and people are captured and carried off by land and sea, taken to small Saudi Arabian ports and sold in slave markets.

In 1962, Yemen was one of the last countries worldwide to abolish slavery. The 1962 revolution in Yemen lead to the abolition of slavery by the government in (North) Yemen, but in British South Yemen the British colonial authorities continued to avoid interfering in the issue of slavery, and slavery in South Yemen was instead abolished by the socialist National Liberation Front (NFL) who took over when the British left in 1967.

Yemen is also a member state of the United Nations. All United Nations member states are subject to the UDHR, which specifically says in Article 4, that "No one shall be held in slavery or servitude; slavery and the slave trade shall be prohibited in all their forms." This declaration outlines basic rights that all human beings are entitled to. The rights outlined in the declaration become legally enforceable, since they define the terms 'fundamental freedoms' and 'human rights', which themselves feature in the United Nations Charter. All member states of the United Nations are legally obliged to comply with the United Nations Charter.

Besides this, the 1926 Slavery Convention also exists, which at its creation aimed to prevent slavery, and the slave trade. It specifically defined what slavery and the slave trade were, and all participants agreed to prevent, and gradually eliminate all slavery that existed within their country, and also to create penalties for anyone found to be slave trading, or involved in the control of a slave. As of 1987, Yemen became a party to this convention, meaning they agreed with the aim of it, and agreed to the obligations it imposed upon parties.

While not all slaves in Yemen were of African origin, there developed racist stereotypes in Yemen associating black skin with slavery, and this contributed to a discrimination of people with African origin also after the abolition of slavery.

== Modern day slavery in Yemen ==
For someone to be considered a slave, they must fit into one of the following four categories: 1) Be threatened, either physically or mentally, to work. 2) Controlled or owned by another person, through either threats, or abuse that is physical or mental. 3) Treated as a chattel, bought or sold as property, dehumanised. 4) Restrained physically, or has limitations on freedom of movement.

It has been reported that two main types of slavery currently exist in Yemen. The first is general human trafficking, which can be defined as adults or children lured into a situation that results in their exploitation, by way of threats, violence or deliberate misrepresentation, and then forced to perform certain jobs. The second type is those who are not subject to trafficking, but instead still endure slavery and abuse. Such abuse has been reported to be depriving slaves of a basic right of access to water, unless their owner permits it.

Children are extremely vulnerable to slavery in Yemen, as any children of existing slaves are also destined for a life of slavery, and also children are often forced to work for minimal, or even no pay, in the agricultural sector. The legal age for children to begin work in Yemen is 14, and the minimum age they can begin work that is considered to be hazardous is 18. However, in 2012, it was found that 13.6% of children aged 5 to 14 were working across several sectors, though the most predominant sector involving children was found to be the agricultural sector, which incidentally is also one of the most hazardous sectors.

As well as child slavery, it has been discovered that there are also adult slaves who are controlled by their owners, who work in private homes, made to perform certain tasks.

=== Causes of modern day slavery ===
A likely cause of the existing slavery in Yemen with regards to the illegality of it, is the extent of the poverty within certain communities. Abdulhadi Al-Azazi, a member of the team investigating slavery in Yemen, suggested that because of the levels of poverty, affected people may enable themselves to be controlled by wealthy people in order to have a better quality of life than what they can provide for themselves.

Another possible factor in the existence of slavery in Yemen is government corruption, as slavery is easy to get away with and no steps are taken to put an end to it. Besides this, the slavery cycle is difficult to get out of when there is no government intervention, or real awareness by the public and other countries as to what is going on, which is part of the cause of slavery in Yemen. If people are not aware of what is happening, they cannot do anything about it. The slavery cycle has been described as poverty, followed by slavery, then as a result lack of education, and therefore no kind of freedom at all. This means any children of existing slaves are led to believe the same as their parents – that they are not entitled to freedom and they must do as they are told by their owners. In 2019, during the Yemeni Civil War, there were allegations of the Houthis supporting the restoration of slavery with the families of Houthi leaders holding more than 1,800 citizens as slaves and servants in their residences and places of work.

== Gallery ==
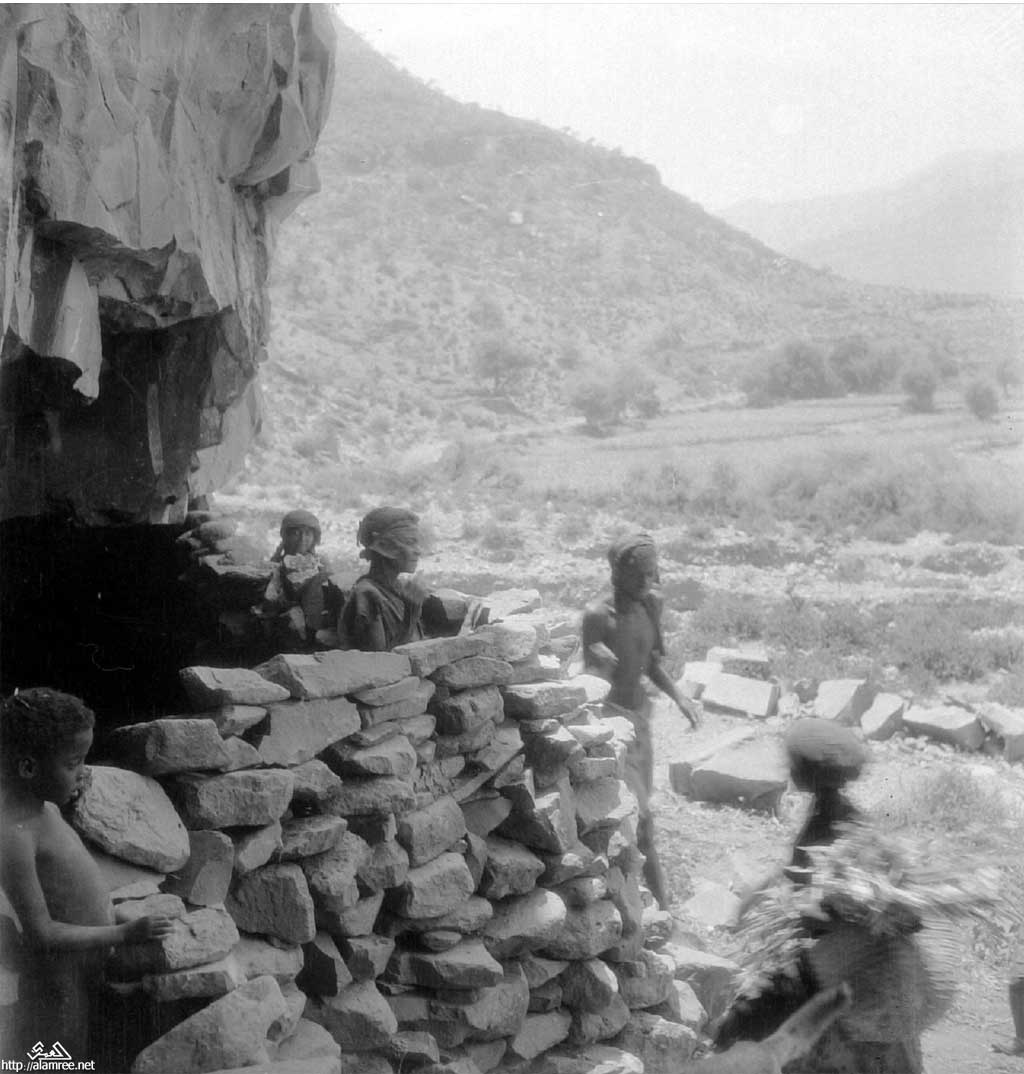
The caves of Al-Akhdam in Sanaa in 1942

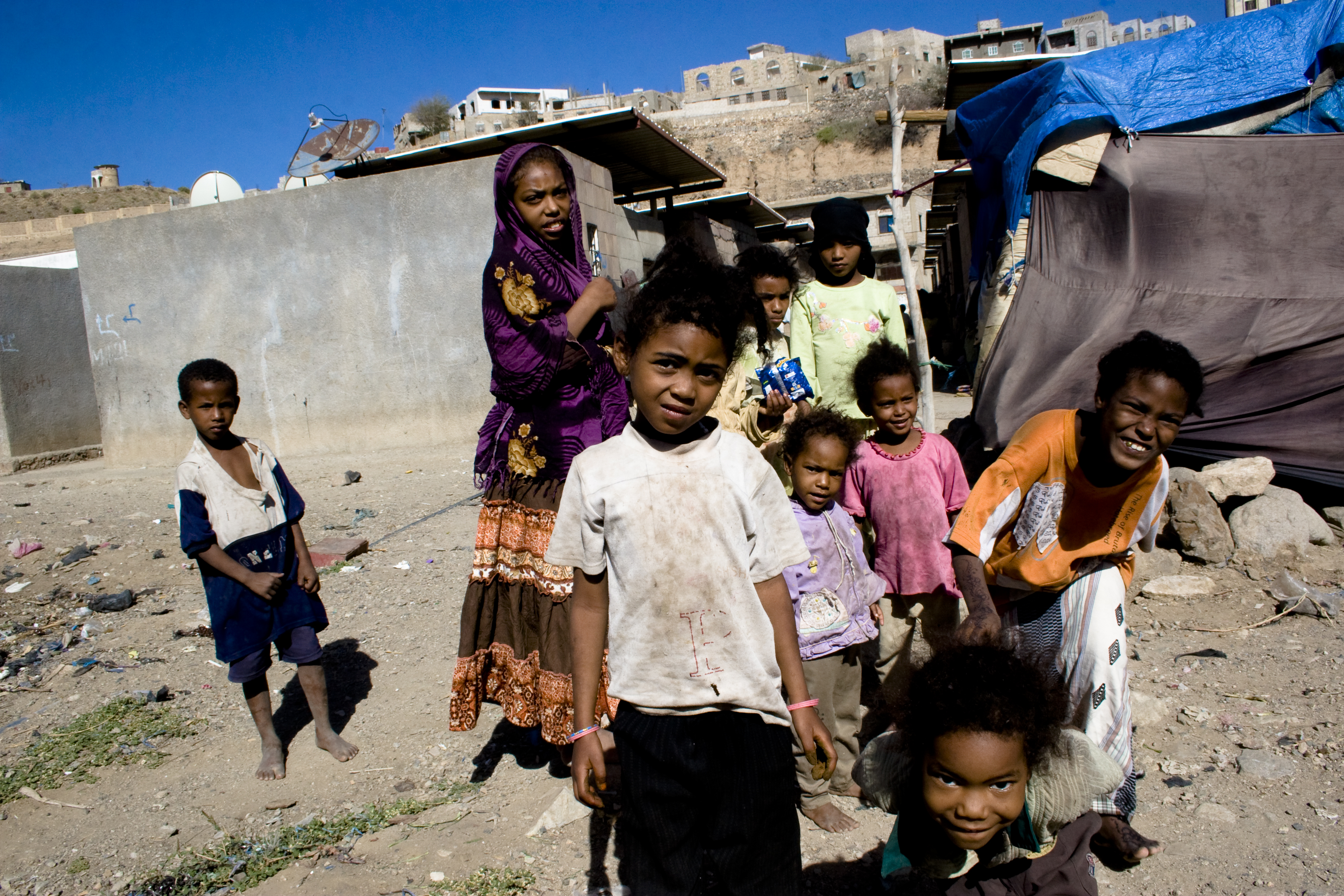
Children in an Akhdam neighborhood, Taizz, Yemen

== See also ==
- Al-Akhdam
- Human rights in Yemen
- Human trafficking in the Middle East
- Zana Muhsen
- Al-Muhamashīn
