= Anti-Slavery International =

Human rights organisation

Coordinates: 51.485913°N 0.116561°W

- Abbreviation: Anti-Slavery
- Founded: 1839; 187 years ago
- Purpose: Anti-slavery
- Headquarters: London, SW9; United Kingdom
- Region served: International
- Chief Executive Officer: Mark Goldring
- Website: www.antislavery.org

Anti-Slavery International, founded as the British and Foreign Anti-Slavery Society in 1839, is an international non-governmental organisation, registered charity and advocacy group, based in the United Kingdom. It is the world's oldest international human rights organisation, and works exclusively against slavery and related abuses.

In 1909, the society merged with the Aborigines' Protection Society to form the Anti-Slavery and Aborigines' Protection Society, whose prominent member was Kathleen Simon, Viscountess Simon. It became the Anti-Slavery Society in July 1947, and from 1956 to 1990 it was named the Anti-Slavery Society for the Protection of Human Rights. In 1990 it was renamed Anti-Slavery International for the Protection of Human Rights, and in 1995 relaunched as Anti-Slavery International.

It owes its origins to the radical element of an older organisation also commonly referred to as the "Anti-Slavery Society", the Society for the Mitigation and Gradual Abolition of Slavery Throughout the British Dominions, which had substantially achieved abolition of slavery in the British Empire by August 1838.

The new British and Foreign Anti-Slavery Society was created to campaign against the practice of slavery in other countries.

== History ==
A painting of the 1840 World's Anti-Slavery Convention. Use a cursor to see who is who.

=== Background ===
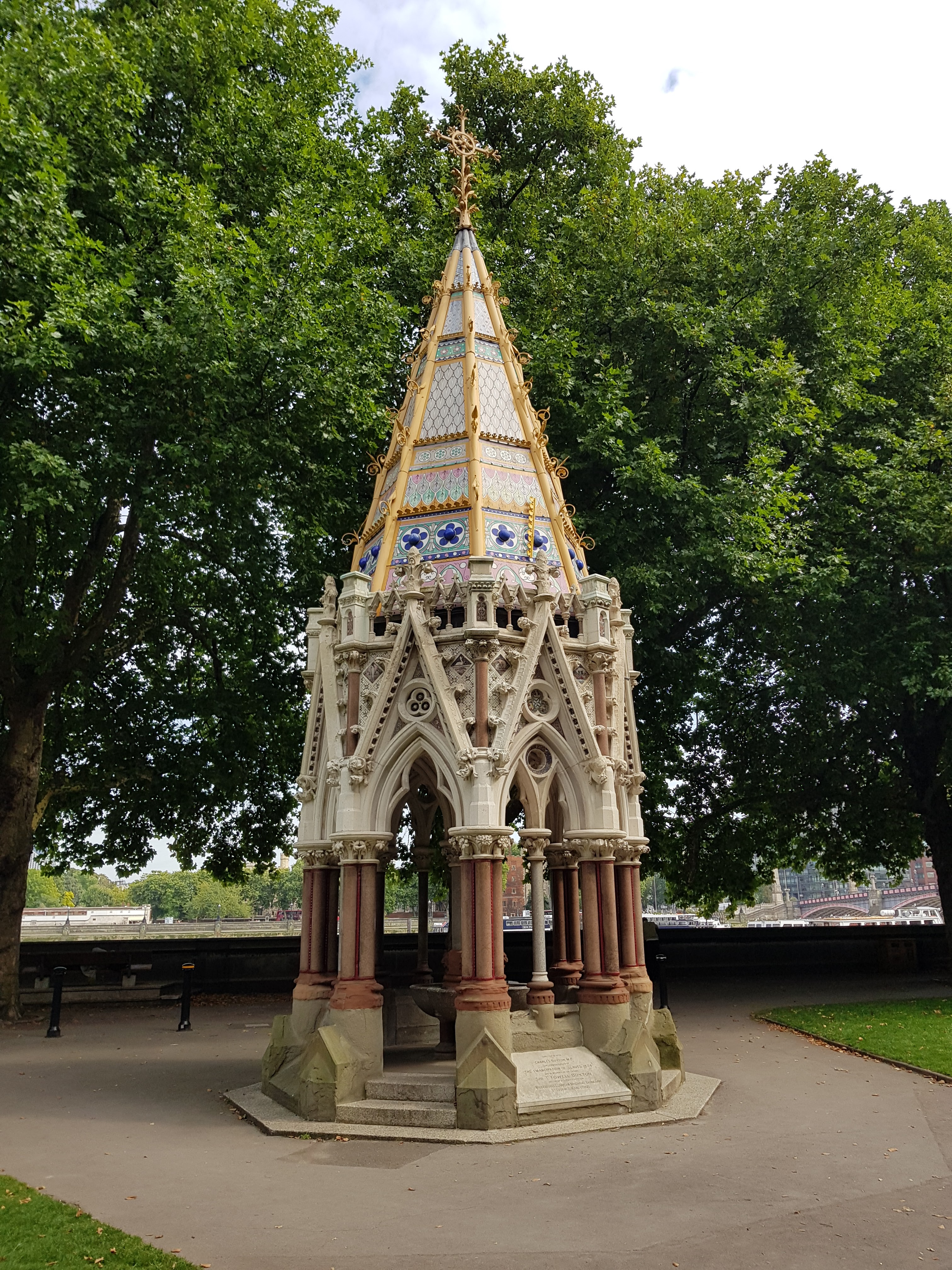
Buxton Memorial Fountain, celebrating the emancipation of slaves in the British Empire in 1834, in Victoria Tower Gardens, Millbank, Westminster, London

The Society for Effecting the Abolition of the Slave Trade, founded in 1787, also referred to as the Abolition Society, was responsible for achieving abolition of the international slave trade, when the British Parliament passed the Slave Trade Act 1807.

The Society for the Mitigation and Gradual Abolition of Slavery Throughout the British Dominions, later known as the (London) Anti-slavery Society, was founded in 1823 and was committed to the abolition of slavery in the British Empire, which was substantially achieved in 1838 under the terms of the Slavery Abolition Act 1833.

=== 19th-century ===
With abolition of slavery throughout the British dominions achieved, British abolitionists in the Agency Committee of the Anti-Slavery Society considered that a successor organisation was needed to tackle slavery worldwide. Largely under the guidance of English activist Joseph Sturge, the committee duly formed a new society, British and Foreign Anti-Slavery Society on 17 April 1839, which worked to outlaw slavery in other countries. It became widely known as the Anti-Slavery Society, as had the earlier society.

The first secretary was John Harfield Tredgold, the first treasurer, George William Alexander of Stoke Newington. Along with the founding committee, which included the Anglican Thomas Fowell Buxton, the Quaker William Allen, and the Congregationalist Josiah Conder, they organised the first World Anti-Slavery Convention in London in 1840, that attracted delegates from around the world (including from the United States of America, in the South of which slavery was at times referred to as "our peculiar institution") to the Freemasons' Hall, London on 12 June 1840. Many delegates were notable abolitionists, with Thomas Clarkson the key speaker, and the image of the meeting was captured in a remarkable painting that still hangs in the National Portrait Gallery in London. The convention had been advertised as a "whole world" convention, but the delegates representing anti-slavery societies in the United States included several women, among them Lucretia Mott and Elizabeth Cady Stanton, who later were instrumental in the movement for women's rights. Convention leaders refused to seat the women delegates from America, and prominent male abolitionists such as Thomas Knight were outraged. He went on to form his own society.

In the 1850s, under Louis Chamerovzow, the society helped John Brown write and publish his autobiography a decade before the American Civil War ended slavery in the United States.

The second secretary of the Anti-Slavery Society, appointed under the honorary secretaries Joseph Cooper and Edmund Sturge, was the Rev. Aaron Buzacott (1829–81), the son of a South Seas missionary also named Aaron Buzacott. With American slavery abolished in 1865, Buzacott worked closely with Joseph Cooper in researching and publishing work designed to help abolish slavery in elsewhere, particularly in the Middle East, Turkey and Africa.

=== 20th century ===
The first half of the 20th-century was the last phase of the campaign against legal chattel slavery. Legal chattel slavery was finally ended on the Arabian Peninsula between 1937 and 1970. Mauritania ended slavery in 1981. The second half of the 20th-century saw a shift to the campaign against modern slavery, exploitative working conditions and illegal trafficking.

==== Before World War II ====
At the beginning of the 20th century Anti-Slavery Society campaigned against slavery practices perpetrated in the Congo Free State by King Leopold II of Belgium. It was the first campaign in history that used photography to document the abuses (photographs were taken by the missionary Alice Seeley Harris). The campaign eventually helped bring an end to Leopold's tyranny.

In 1909, the society merged with the Aborigines' Protection Society to form the Anti-Slavery and Aborigines' Protection Society. Kathleen Simon, Viscountess Simon was a prominent member and stalwart of the society.

In the 1920s, the Society helped end the indentured labour system in the British colonies after campaigning against the use of Indian and Chinese "coolies". In 1921 Played a pivotal role in ending the activities of the Peruvian Amazon Company, which was using indigenous slave labour in rubber production.

The organisation also successfully lobbied for the League of Nations inquiry into slavery, which resulted in the 1926 Slavery Convention that obliged all ratifying states to end slavery. When the League of Nations collected information of slavery on a global level in 1922–1923, Anti-Slavery International and the Swiss Bureau international pour la défense des indigènes (International Bureau for the Defense of the Native Races, BIDI) were among the most important participants in it. Following the investigation, the League founded the Temporary Slavery Commission (TSC) in June 1924. The TSC filed their report on 1925 with the recommendation to outlaw the institution of legal chattel slavery and slave trade, which resulted in the 1926 Slavery Convention.

In 1932 the Committee of Experts on Slavery was established to investigate the efficiency of the 1926 Slavery Convention, which in turn resulted in the establishment of the permanent Advisory Committee of Experts on Slavery (ACE).

The Anti-Slavery Society celebrated the establishment of the Advisory Committee of Experts on Slavery (ACE), which was established on the centenary of the Slavery Abolition Act 1833, as the final end of slavery, Reginald Coupland expressed the hope that "the appropriate machinery" to ensure the execution of the 1926 Slavery Convention had been created, and that he had no doubt that "except perhaps in remote and unsettled regions of the world beyond the reach of civilized opinion, the final eradication....of slavery" had been assured.

The global investigation of the occurrence of slavery and slave trade performed by the Advisory Committee of Experts on Slavery (ACE) of the League of Nations between 1934 and 1939 was interrupted by the outbreak of the World War II, but it was the foundation for the work against slavery performed by the UN after the war.

In 1944, a Journalist James Ewing Ritchie issued a paper to the society on sugar trade and slavery.

==== After World War II ====
Between 1945 and 1962, the Anti-Slavery Society actively fought to end the ongoing Red Sea slave trade and the slavery in the Arabian Peninsula, and built allies across the world and in the United States to achieve its goal until slavery in Saudi Arabia was finally abolished in 1962.

When the League of Nations was succeeded by the United Nations (UN) after the end of the World War II, Greenidge of the Anti-Slavery International worked for the UN to continue the investigation of global slavery conducted by the ACE of the League, and in February 1950 the Ad hoc Committee on Slavery of the United Nations was inaugurated. By the 1950s, legal chattel slavery and slave trade was formally abolished by law in almost the entire world, with the exception of the Arabian Peninsula. Chattel slavery was still legal in Saudi Arabia, in Yemen, in the Trucial States and in Oman, while slavery in Qatar was abolished in 1952, and slaves were supplied for the Arabian Peninsula by the Red Sea slave trade.

The UN Committee on Slavery presented its raport of global slavery to the United Nations Economic and Social Council in 1951; it was published in 1953, and a Supplementary Convention on the Abolition of Slavery was written in 1954, and introduced in 1956.

The Anti Slavery Society actively campaigned against the slavery and slave trade in the Arabian Peninsula from the conclusion of World War II until the 1970s, and particularly publicized Saudi Arabia's central role in 20th-century chattel Slavery within the United Nations, but their efforts was long opposed by the lack of support from London and Washington. The British Foreign Office's internal reports noted an upswing in the slave trade to Saudi Arabia after WII, but preferred to turn a blind eye to it to avoid international exposure of their own Gulf Sheikh allies' complicity in the slave trade.

The US Eisenhower administration sought to undermine the Bricker Amendment by a retreat from the UN, and made Saudi Arabia a cornerstone of the Eisenhower Doctrine, and therefore abstained from the United Nations Supplementary Convention on the Abolition of Slavery, the Slave Trade, and Institutions and Practices Similar to Slavery. The British Anti Slavery Society failed to pass stricter enforcements at the 1956 UN Supplementary Convention on Slavery, but the issue started to attract international attention.

When President Kennedy took office, the issue of slavery within the US ally Saudi Arabia had caused growing domestic and international attention and caused damage to the Kennedy administration's liberal world-order rhetoric and the US-Saudi partnership, and Kennedy pressed Saudi leaders to "modernize and reform" if they wished US military assistance during the Yemeni Civil War. President Kennedy wished to strengthen the UN, which in turn also strengthened the long going abolition campaign of the British Anti Slavery Society within the UN and gave it gravitas.

The Kennedy administration also experienced international pressure from influential secular Middle East regional leaders like Gamal Abdul Nasser, as well as from the newly decolonization African states, whose own citizens were the most common victims of the slave trade to the Arabian Peninsula, and whose good will was necessary Kennedy's anti Soviet New Frontier agenda in the Global South. The Kennedy administration therefore put pressure on Saudi Arabia to introduce "modernization reforms", a request which was heavily directed against slavery.

In November 1962, Faisal of Saudi Arabia finally prohibited the owning of slaves in Saudi Arabia, followed by the abolition of slavery in Yemen in 1962, slavery in Dubai 1963 and slavery in Oman in 1970.

From 1947 to 1956, it was called the Anti-Slavery Society, and from 1956 to 1990 the Anti-Slavery Society for the Protection of Human Rights. In 1990, it was renamed Anti-Slavery International for the Protection of Human Rights, and in 1995 Anti-Slavery International.

Anti-Slavery International was one of the original supporters of the "End Child Prostitution, Pornography and Trafficking" campaign (ECPAT), and helped set up the UK branch in the 1990s. It also helped to organise the 1998 Global March against Child Labour, which helped lead to the adoption of a new International Labour Organization Convention on the Worst Forms of Child Labour in 1999.

=== 21st century: Modern-day slavery ===
In the 21st century, it worked with Nepalese NGO INSEC to secure Government backing to abolish the Kamaiya form of bonded labour; in 2003 with local NGO Timidria conducted a survey that led to the criminalisation of slavery in Niger, and lobbied the Brazilian government to introduce a National Plan for the Eradication of Slavery. Two years later ASI organised a major campaign on child camel jockeys in the Gulf States, which influenced the UAE's decision to rescue and repatriate up to 3,000 child camel jockeys.

In the UK, it successfully lobbied to make trafficking of sexual and labour exploitation a criminal offence in 2004.

In 2008, it was amongst groups that supported a former slave, Hadijatou Mani, in obtaining the verdict of the Economic Community of West African States (ECOWAS) court that found the state of Niger guilty of failing to protect her from slavery. The ruling set a legal precedent with respect to the obligations of states to protect its citizens from slavery

In June 2010, following the campaign by Anti-Slavery International and Liberty the UK Parliament introduced a criminal offence of forced labour in the Coroners and Justice Act 2009. In 2010 the organisation also exposed the routine use of the forced labour of girls and young women in the manufacture of garments in Southern India for Western high streets, prompting, eventually, business and international civil society efforts to end the practice.

Anti-Slavery lobbied the UK government to sign up to an EU anti-trafficking law to protect the victims and secure justice for people who have been trafficked (2011). It also played a big part in lobbying the International Labour Organization to adopt a Convention on Decent Work for Domestic Workers in June 2011.

In 2021, Anti-Slavery International has pressured businesses and governments to address conditions in the Xinjiang cotton industry.

==== Human trafficking ====
Human trafficking is the illegal transportation of kidnapped people, including children, across international borders in order to put them into slavery at the destination. This form of modern slavery is one of the most common and may affect the most people: it is estimated that between 500,000 and 800,000 victims enter the trade each year.

The International Labour Organization estimates that, by their definitions, over 40 million people are in some form of slavery today. 24.9 million people are in forced labor, of whom 16 million people are exploited in the private sector such as domestic work, construction or agriculture; 4.8 million persons in forced sexual exploitation, and 4 million persons in forced labour imposed by state authorities. 15.4 million people are in forced marriage.

Anti-Slavery International points to the lack of enforcement of existing laws as a barrier to stopping human trafficking. Discrimination on the basis of social status, religion, ethnicity, gender and immigration status operate as additional barriers. The organization joined more than 180 other groups in a campaign to pressure retailers such as Nike, Apple and Gap to stop using forced labour of Uighurs in their factories located in China.

== Overview ==
Anti-Slavery International is the world's oldest international human rights organisation, and bases its work on the United Nations treaties against slavery. It has consultative status with the United Nations Economic and Social Council and observer status at the International Labour Organization. It is a non-religious, non-political independent organisation. It works closely with partner organisations from around the world to tackle all forms of slavery.

== Publications ==
The society published The Anti-Slavery Reporter from 1839, taking over from the earlier organisation (named the London Anti-slavery Society in its last year of existence).

The journal merged with the Aborigines' Friend to form the Anti-Slavery Reporter and Aborigines' Friend in 1909, when the BFASS merged with the Aborigines' Protection Society.

== Anti-Slavery Award ==
Anti-Slavery International instituted the Anti-Slavery Award in 1991 to draw attention to the continuing problem of slavery in the world today and to provide recognition for long-term, courageous campaigning by organisations or individuals in the countries most affected.

- 1991: Bonded Labour Liberation Front (India)
- 1992: Ricardo Rezende
- 1993: End Child Prostitution in Asian Tourism (ECPAT)
- 1994: Edwin Paraison
- 1995: Harry Wu
- 1996: Regional Indigenous Organisation of Atalaya (OIRA)
- 1997: Pureza Lopes Loiola
- 1998: Cheïkh Sa'ad Bouh Kamara
- 1999: Vivek and Vidyullata Pandit
- 2000: George Omona
- 2001: Association for Community Development (ACD)
- 2002: Backward Society Education (BASE)
- 2003: Vera Lesko
- 2004: Timidria
- 2005: Cecilia Flores-Oebanda (Visayan Forum Foundation)
- 2006: James Aguer Figueira
- 2007: Coalition of Immokalee Workers (CIW)
- 2009: SOS Esclaves
- 2010: Justice 4 Domestic Workers
- 2012: Temedt, a social movement in Mali

== See also ==
- List of organizations that combat human trafficking
- Brazilian Anti-Slavery Society
- Blood Bricks Campaign
