= Advisory Committee of Experts on Slavery =

Permanent committee of the League of Nations

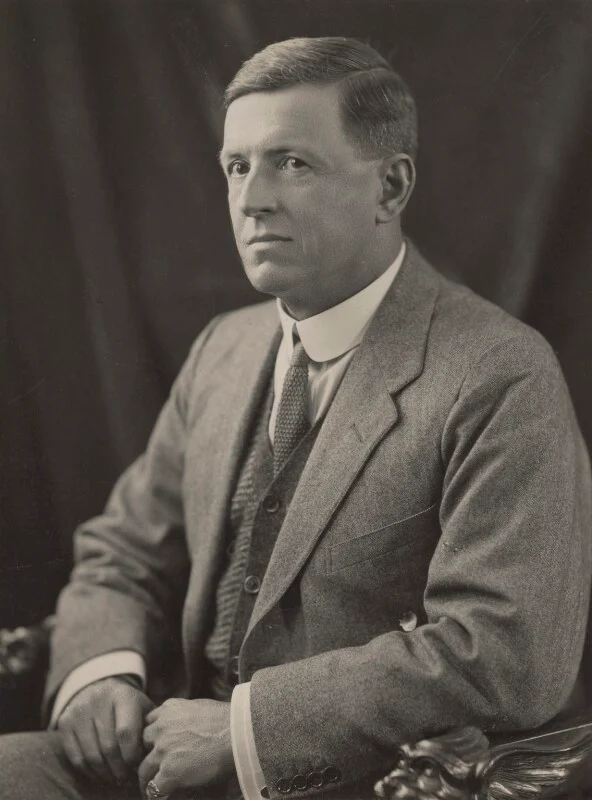
Sir-William-George-Maxwell

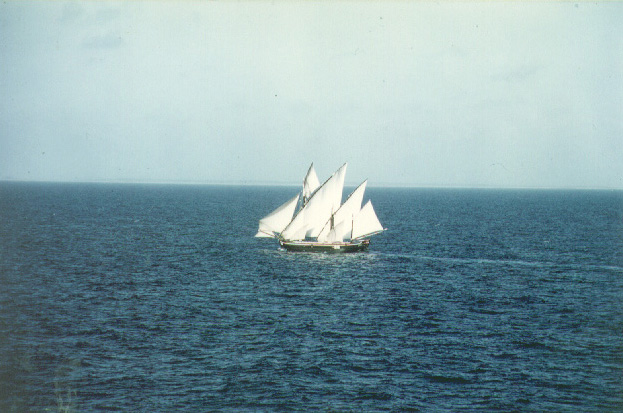
Dhows were used to transport goods and slaves

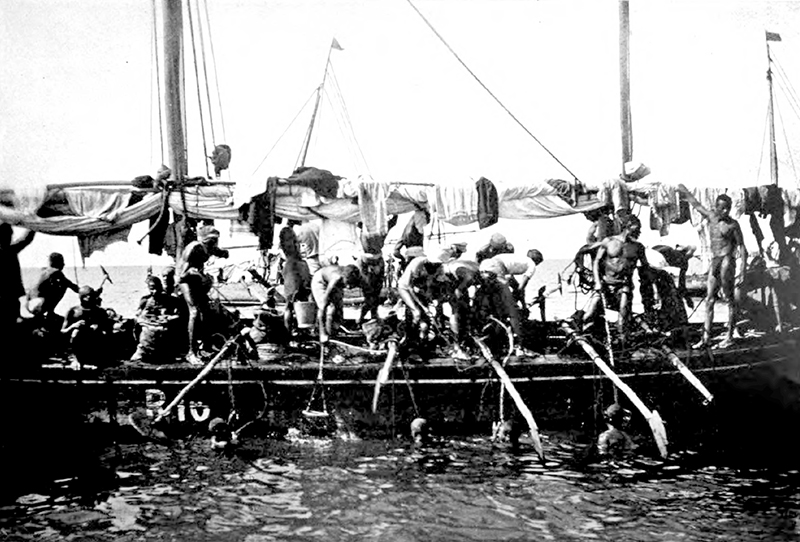
Pearl divers in the Persian Gulf. At the time, the pearl industry was dominated by slave labor.

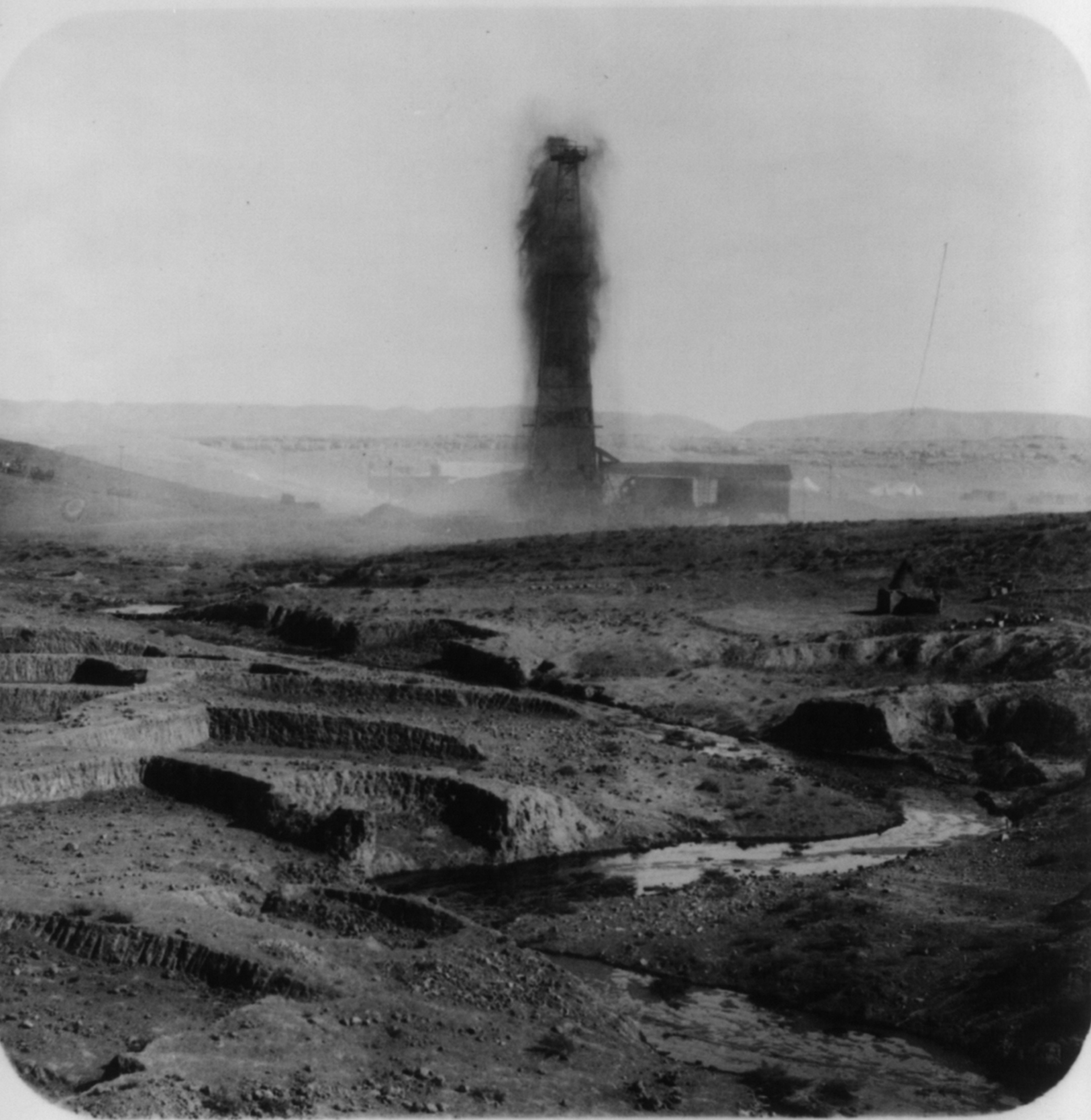
Oil field 1932. The British Foreign Office unsuccessfully asked the Iraq Petroleum Company not to use slave labor in the Gulf.

The Advisory Committee of Experts on Slavery (ACE) was a permanent committee of the League of Nations, inaugurated in 1933. It was the first permanent slavery committee of the League of Nations, which was founded after a decade of work addressing the issue of slavery by temporary committees within the League.

The ACE conducted a global investigation concerning slavery, slave trade and force labor, and recommended solutions to address the issue. Its work lay the ground for the Supplementary Convention on the Abolition of Slavery of 1956.

== History ==
=== Foundation ===
Beginning in the early 1920s, the League of Nations undertook an active campaign against chattel slavery and the slave trade. The work of its Temporary Slavery Commission led to the adoption of the 1926 Slavery Convention. In 1932 the Committee of Experts on Slavery (CES) was established to investigate the efficiency of the 1926 Slavery Convention. The result convinced the League of the need to establish a permanent committee to address the issue.

The ACE were not to be authorized to conduct investigations directly, but only to accept documented information from governments. It was to be purely advisory and its proceedings confidential, composed of seven independent experts, appointed indefinitely, who were to study the documented evidence and submit reports to suggest methods to approve the work to end slavery and the slave trade. The slavery addressed was to be chattel slavery, not forced labor.

In 1933 the CES established the first permanent slavery committee, the Advisory Committee of Experts on Slavery (ACE). The ACE held its first meeting the following year, and met annually five times between 1934 and 1938.

The Anti-Slavery Society celebrated the establishment of the ACE, which was established on the centenary of the Slavery Abolition Act 1833, as the final end of slavery, Reginald Coupland expressed the hope that "the appropriate machinery" to ensure the execution of the 1926 Slavery Convention had been created, and that he had no doubt that "except perhaps in remote and unsettled regions of the world beyond the reach of civilized opinion, the final eradication ... of slavery" had been assured.

=== Activity ===
The ACE conducted a major international investigation on chattel slavery and slave trade. The committee asked for reports from all member countries of the League of Nations, including the major colonial empires of the time. The governments were asked to report of all forms of slavery and slave trade taking place within the territories under their control, which the member countries of League as subject of the 1926 Slavery Convention were expected to actively oppose.

The issues discussed were the Mui tsai issue, debt bondage and serfdom; the status of women and discriminatory marriage customs were debated, but a difficult issue, and postphoned in 1936.

==== Africa ====
The ACE requested the British Colonial Office to interview all former slaves in Africa why they had remained with their former owners and investigate what had happened to the slaves that did leave; the colonial officers obeyed by order from their governors, and the 1936 Report to the ACE were particularly detailed.

The Italians reported to the ACE that all former slaves in Italian Tripolitania – slavery in Libya had long since been formally abolished – were free to leave their former Arab owners if they wished, but that they stayed because they were socially depressed; and that in the oases of Cyrenaica and the interiour of Sanusiya, the Trans-Saharan slave trade had been erased in parallel with Italian conquest, during which 900 slaves had been freed in the Kufra slave market; that the slaves in Italian Eritrea were now given salary and thus no longer slaves, and that the slavery and slave trade in Somalia had now been abolished.

In 1936 the report to the Advisory Committee of Experts on Slavery from the French, British and Italian stated that they all surveyed the water sources along the caravan routes in the Sahara to combat the Trans-Saharan slave trade from Nigeria to North Africa. In 1937 the report to the Advisory Committee of Experts on Slavery, both France and Spain assured that they actively fought the slave raids from the Trans-Saharan slave traders, and in 1938, the French claimed that they had secured control over the border areas alongside Morocco and Algeria and effectively prevented the Trans-Saharan slave trade in that area.

France reported that slavery had been abolished in all French territories in Africa, including Slavery in Mauritania.

Spain reported that they had abolished the slave trade in Morocco, but avoided mentioning slavery as such. Belgium and Portugal replied ACE that they had nothing further to add after their 1932 report.

Egypt answered the ACE that there were no longer any slavery in Egypt, and that no new slaves could be imported via the ongoing Red Sea slave trade to Egypt since they policed the waters of the Red Sea outside Egypt, preventing any slave trade.

==== Asia ====
A British report acknowledged that while slavery in Palestine and slavery in Jordan was banned by the British colonial authorities, slaves were still kept among the Bedouin shaykhs in Jordan and Palestine under the guise of clientage.

The Netherlands reported that slavery in the Dutch East Indies was eradicated, except for remote areas in Borneo and New Guinea were Dutch control was nominal. China reported that slavery in China did not exist except for the Mui tsai system, which was a very marginal phenomena.

At this point in time, Saudi Arabia was the biggest slave nation in the world, but it was protected from investigation by its ally Britain, who avoided to give any clear information in order to avoid damaging their relationship to Saudi, and gave only vague deflecting answers that Islam encouraged manumission.

The British considered their control over the Gulf region insufficient to do much about the slave trade and slavery in the Trucial States, slavery in Qatar, slavery in Kuwait and slavery in Oman. The British India Office advised the British authorities that any attempts to enforce an anti-slavery treaty in the region could cause economic and political unrest, since slavery was "deeply rooted in religious and political history". The British policy was therefore to assure the League of Nations that the region followed the same anti slavery treaties signed by the British, but in parallel prevent any actual international observations of the area, which would disprove these claims. As late as 1935, the British authorities thus still assured the ACE that the Trucial States, Qatar, Bahrain and Kuwait had banned all slave trading in the region in treaties with the British, while at the same time, the British refused any international inspections in the region which would have revealed that a substantial slave trade was in fact going on, especially within the pearl fishing industry, where the slaves were particularly harshly treated.

In 1936, the British finally acknowledged to the ACE that there was still ongoing slavery and a slave trade in the Trucial States, Oman and Qatar, but claimed that it was limited, and that all slaves who sought asylum at the British Agents Office in Sharjah were granted manumission. In reality, the British reports were deliberately playing down the size of the actual substantial slave trade going on in the region.

Concerning slavery in Kuwait, the official report of the British Foreign Office of 1936 claimed that although there was no anti slavery treaty with Kuwait, the shaykh of Kuwait had "completely stamped out the sale of new slaves", and that the existing slaves were free to complain to the sultan, who manumitted them if their complaints could not be resolved some other way, which was claimed to have diminished the number of slaves in Kuwait. In 1937 the ACE achieved success concerning slavery in Bahrain, when Sir George Maxwell, who produced a 'world review of slavery' for the ACE in 1936, successfully issued pressure on the ruler of Bahrain to abolish slavery.

Slavery in Yemen were given attention in the ACO. In 1936, the British authorities in Aden filed a report about the slavery in Yemen. The British report told of 5,000 to 10,000 slaves in a population of three million. The majority of the slaves were either trafficked from Africa, or born to enslaved Africans in Yemen, and a small minority of the slaves where Caucasian. Most of the male slaves were Africans, occupied in agricultural work or as soldiers. Egypt and Hejaz were also the recipients of Indian women trafficked via Aden and Goa. The report to ACE about Hadhramaut described the existence of Chinese women trafficked from Singapore for enslavement as concubines, Indian women trafficked to Hadrhamaut to be sold by their husbands, and Indian children officially taken there for religious studies, only to be sold upon arrival. The British tried to convince the coastal local rulers of the Aden Protectorate to sign an agreement to ban the slave trade, but by January 1939, few had done so.

==== Policies ====
ACE was dominated by Britain via George Maxwell, who became the dominating member of the ACE. Maxwell successfully advocated for the ACE to follow the predeceeding TSC's definition of slavery as exclusively referring to chattel slavery and ownership of humans, a definition of slavery inherited by the TSC, and which excluded all other forms of forced labor in order to avoid conflict.

George Maxwell focused his attention on slaves captured by slave traders; for people born slaves, he advocated manumission as a reward for good behaviour, justified by passages from the Quran.

In 1938 George Maxwell of the ACE concluded that slave raids were almost nonexistent; that slave trade were significantly reduced; that the chattel slavery in the Aden Protectorate and the Persian Gulf were under control; and that in regard to slavery in Saudi Arabia and slavery in Yemen, nothing more could be expected.

In February 1939, it was decided that the sixth meeting of the ACE was to be postponed until later that same year; however by the outbreak of World War II on 3 September 1939 the activity of the ACE was effectively ended.

=== Aftermath and legacy ===
The work of the ACE collected information only from published sources, petitions, personal experience, government reports and vetted NGOs; and while it was inhibited by the colonial powers' (such as Britain's reluctance to interfere in the chattel slavery in the Arabian Peninsula), it did result in both the British and the French colonial powers refining their anti-slavery law policies.

The global investigation of the occurrence of slavery and slave trade performed by the ACE between 1934 and 1939 was interrupted by the outbreak of World War II, but it was the foundation for the work against slavery performed by the UN after the war.

When the League of Nations was succeeded by the United Nations (UN) after the end of the World War II, Charles Wilton Wood Greenidge of the Anti-Slavery International worked for the UN to continue the investigation of global slavery conducted by the ACE of the League, and in February 1950 the Ad Hoc Committee on Slavery of the United Nations was inaugurated, which ultimately resulted in the introduction of the Supplementary Convention on the Abolition of Slavery.

== See also ==
- Brussels Anti-Slavery Conference 1889–90, 1889
- Temporary Slavery Commission, 1924
- Committee of Experts on Slavery, 1932
- Ad Hoc Committee on Slavery, 1950
