= Bureau international pour la défense des indigènes =

Swiss humanitarian organization

Bureau international pour la défense des indigènes (BIDI), or International Bureau for the Defense of the Native Races, was an international Swiss organization, founded 1913.

== History ==
BIDI was founded in Geneva by René Claparède, chair of the Swiss League for the Protection of Indigenous People, which was founded give years prior, and three Evangelic philanthropists: Eugene Mercier-Glardon, Louis Ferriere, and Edouard Junod.

BIDI had 300 Swiss members at its foundation. It was to function as an international representative of the rights of indigenous people in the contemporary colonies; encourage them to engage in an equivalent of the Red Cross called the Black Cross; and to function as an umbrella organization for other organizations of the rights of indigenous people.

During the Interwar period, the BIDI was a NGO of the League of Nations and collaborated with the Anti-Slavery Society to combat slavery worldwide. Both organizations contributed in the international report 1922–1923, which resulted in the foundation of the Temporary Slavery Commission of the League of Nations.
