= Anti-Slavery Reporter =

British journal

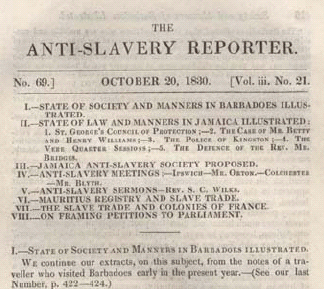
Anti Slavery Reporter October 1830

The Anti-Slavery Reporter was founded in London in 1825 as the Anti-Slavery Monthly Reporter by Zachary Macaulay (1768–1838), a Scottish philanthropist who devoted most of his life to the anti-slavery movement. It was also referred to as the British and Foreign Anti-Slavery Reporter, and in 1909 merged with the Aborigines' Friend to form the Anti-Slavery Reporter and Aborigines' Friend. From 1981 the journal was again renamed the Anti-Slavery Reporter, and as a publication of Anti-Slavery International continued to be published occasionally as simply Reporter.

Under Macaulay and its subsequent editors, the journal campaigned vigorously for the abolition of slavery throughout the world in the late 19th century. Later, it focused more on various forms of modern slavery.

It was initially published by the anti-slavery organisation founded in 1823 as the Society for the Mitigation and Gradual Abolition of Slavery Throughout the British Dominions, but after this wound up in 1838, came under the auspices of and published the Annual Reports of the British and Foreign Anti-Slavery Society (now known as Anti-Slavery International.)

== History ==
=== 1823–1838 ===
From 1823 to 1838, the journal was published by the Society for the Mitigation and Gradual Abolition of Slavery Throughout the British Dominions, commonly referred to as "the Anti-Slavery Society".

Volume ii of the Anti-Slavery Monthly Reporter is dated as commencing in June 1827 and ending in May 1828. It was printed in London for the "London Society for the Mitigation and Abolition of Slavery in the British Dominions" (officially the Society for the Mitigation and Gradual Abolition of Slavery Throughout the British Dominions), and printed as a monograph in 1829.

The title remained Anti-Slavery Monthly Reporter until July 1830, dropping the "Monthly" to become The Anti-Slavery Reporter in August 1830 (Volume 3, No. 62?).

=== 1839–1980 ===
In 1839 the new, internationally focused British and Foreign Anti-Slavery Society (BFASS) was founded, after the previous British Empire-focused organisation was wound up. A "new series", described as the 3rd series, started with volume 1, number 1 on 1 January 1846. The title pages for the volumes between 1846 and 1852 read "The British and Foreign Anti-Slavery Reporter".

The journal merged with the Aborigines' Friend to form the Anti-Slavery Reporter and Aborigines' Friend in 1909, when the BFASS merged with the Aborigines' Protection Society to form the Anti-Slavery and Aborigines' Protection Society.

=== 1981–2000s ===
From 1981 the journal was called simply Anti-Slavery Reporter.

It appears to have been published into the 1990s, on an annual or quarterly basis. An Anti-Slavery International publication in 2005 lists in its bibliography "Anti-Slavery International, Reporter, London, various issues between 1999–2005", and states "Anti-Slavery International’s quarterly magazine the Reporter has been published since 1825 and continues to be a leading source of news and analysis in relation to slavery issues".

== Description ==
Under Macaulay and its subsequent editors, the journal campaigned vigorously for the abolition of slavery throughout the world in the late 19th century. Its articles include detailed reports of the activities of the abolitionists; reports of the Parliamentary procedures which ultimately led to the abolition of slavery throughout Britain and her colonies; and details of the political activities of pro- and anti-slavery supporters in other countries.
