= Supplementary Convention on the Abolition of Slavery =

1956 United Nations treaty which builds upon the 1926 Slavery Convention

1956 Supplementary Convention on the Abolition of Slavery, the Slave Trade, and Institutions and Practices Similar to Slavery
- Signed: 7 September 1956
- Location: Geneva, Switzerland
- Effective: 30 April 1957
- Condition: Fulfilled
- Signatories: 35
- Parties: 124 (as at March 2018)(Convention and subsequent Protocol)

The Supplementary Convention on the Abolition of Slavery, the full title of which is the Supplementary Convention on the Abolition of Slavery, the Slave Trade, and Institutions and Practices Similar to Slavery, is a 1956 United Nations treaty which builds upon the 1926 Slavery Convention, which is still operative and which proposed to secure the abolition of slavery and of the slave trade, and the Forced Labour Convention of 1930, which banned forced or compulsory labour, by banning debt bondage, serfdom, child marriage, servile marriage, and child servitude.

== Background ==
The Supplementary Convention on the Abolition of Slavery was preceded by the 1926 Slavery Convention. In 1932 the Committee of Experts on Slavery was established to investigate the efficiency of the 1926 Slavery Convention, which in turn resulted in the establishment of the permanent Advisory Committee of Experts on Slavery (ACE). The global investigation of the occurrence of slavery and slave trade performed by the ACE between 1934 and 1939 was interrupted by the outbreak of the World War II, but it was the foundation for the work against slavery performed by the UN after the war.

When the League of Nations was succeeded by the United Nations (UN) after the end of the World War II, Charles Wilton Wood Greenidge of the Anti-Slavery International worked for the UN to continue the investigation of global slavery conducted by the ACE of the League, and in February 1950 the Ad hoc Committee on Slavery of the United Nations was inaugurated. By the 1950s, legal chattel slavery and slave trade was formally abolished by law in almost the entire world, with the exception of the Arabian Peninsula. Chattel slavery was still legal in Saudi Arabia, in Yemen, in the Trucial States and in Oman, while slavery in Qatar was abolished in 1952, and slaves were supplied for the Arabian Peninsula by the Red Sea slave trade.

The UN Committee on Slavery presented its raport of global slavery to the United Nations Economic and Social Council in 1951; it was published in 1953, and a Supplementary Convention on the Abolition of Slavery was written in 1954, and introduced in 1956.

In the 1950s, in connection to the Ad Hoc Committee on Slavery and the Supplementary Convention on the Abolition of Slavery, Barnett Janner described Saudi Arabia and Yemen as the only remaining states where slavery was still a legal institution:

The shipping of slaves occurs in only one particular area of the world, in the seas around Arabia. The warships most likely to search such slavers would be British, and I feel sure that there would not be any abuse of the right to search. I am sorry that we gave up the fight for that right. As far as I know, Saudi Arabia and Yemen are the only States in the world where chattel slavery is still a legal institution. Only a year or so ago a French Deputy—the person, I assume, to whom my hon. Friend referred—investigated the situation and found that every year ignorant Africans are lured on by agents to make a pilgrimage to Mecca. They are not told, of course, that they need a Saudi Arabian visa. When they arrive in Saudi Arabia without a visa they are arrested and put into prison for a few days and then handed over to licensed slave dealers. In addition, raids are made in Baluchistan and the Sheikdoms of the Persian Gulf and people are captured and carried off by land and sea, taken to small Saudi Arabian ports and sold in slave markets.

== Summary of key articles ==
Article 1
The parties commit to abolish and abandon debt bondage, serfdom, servile marriage and child servitude.
Article 2
The parties commit to enacting minimum ages of marriage, encouraging registration of marriages, and encouraging the public declaration of consent to marriage.
Article 3
Criminalisation of slave trafficking.
Article 4
Runaway slaves who take refuge on flag vessels of parties shall thereby ipso facto attain their freedom.
Article 5
Criminalisation of the marking (including mutilation and branding) of slaves and servile persons.
Article 6
Criminalisation of enslavement and giving others into slavery.
Article 7
Definitions of "slave", "a person of servile status" and "slave trade"
Article 9
No reservations may be made to this convention.
Article 12
This Convention shall apply to all non-self-governing-trust, colonial and other non-metropolitan territories to the international relations of which any State Party is responsible.

== See also ==
- Anti-Slavery International
- Contemporary slavery
- History of slavery
- Slave Trade Acts
- Slavery in international law
- Slavery in the Trucial States
- Slavery in Saudi Arabia
- Slavery in Qatar
- Slavery in Kuwait
- Slavery in Bahrain
