= 1926 Slavery Convention =

League of Nations anti-slavery treaty

- Signed: 25 September 1926
- Location: Geneva
- Effective: 9 March 1927
- Condition: Fulfilled
- Parties: 99 as of 2013 (Convention and subsequent Protocol)
- Depositary: Secretary-General of the League of Nations
- Languages: English and French

The 1926 Slavery Convention or the Convention to Suppress the Slave Trade and Slavery is an international treaty created under the auspices of the League of Nations and first signed on 25 September 1926. It was registered in League of Nations Treaty Series on 9 March 1927, the same day it went into effect. The objective of the convention is to confirm and advance the suppression of slavery and the slave trade and was extended in 1956 with the Supplementary Convention on the Abolition of Slavery, under the auspices of the United Nations.

== Background ==
In the Brussels Conference Act of 1890, the signatories "declared that they were equally animated by the firm intention of putting an end to the traffic in African slaves". It was supplemented and revised by the Convention of Saint-Germain-en-Laye, signed by the Allied Powers of the First World War on 10 September 1919, in which the signatories undertook to "endeavour to secure the complete suppression of slavery in all its forms and of the slave trade by land and sea" (Article 11).

The Red Sea slave trade and slavery in the Arabian Peninsula, and particular the slave trade in Hejaz, attracted attention by the League of Nations and contributed to the creation of the later 1926 Slavery Convention, obliging the British to combat the slave trade in the area.

The Temporary Slavery Commission (TSC) was appointed by the Council of the League of Nations in June 1924. The commission was mixed in composition including former colonial governors such as Frederick Lugard, as well as a representative from Haiti, and a representative from the International Labour Organization. The TSC filed their report on 1925 with the recommendation to outlaw the institution of legal chattel slavery and slave trade, which resulted in the 1926 Slavery Convention. In 1932 the Committee of Experts on Slavery was established to investigate the efficiency of the 1926 Slavery Convention, which in turn resulted in the establishment of the permanent Advisory Committee of Experts on Slavery.

== Significance ==
The convention established concrete rules and articles to advance the suppression of slavery and the slave trade.

Slavery was defined in Article 1 as

the status or condition of a person over whom any or all of the powers attaching to the right of ownership are exercised

The slave trade was defined as including

all acts involved in the capture, acquisition or disposal of a person with intent to reduce him to slavery; all acts involved in the acquisition of a slave with a view to selling or exchanging him; all acts of disposal by sale or exchange of a slave acquired with a view to being sold or exchanged, and, in general, every act of trade or transport in slaves.

== Selected articles ==
Article 2

The parties agreed to prevent and suppress the slave trade and to progressively bring about the complete elimination of slavery in all its forms.

Article 6

The parties undertook to promulgate severe penalties for slave trading, slaveholding, and enslavement.

== Participants ==
As of 2013, there are 99 countries that have signed, acceded to, ratified, succeeded to, or otherwise committed to participation in the conventions as amended, and its subsequent protocol. The countries and the year of their first commitment to participation are as follows:

Afghanistan (1954), Albania (1957), Algeria (1963), Australia (1953), Austria (1954), Azerbaijan (1996), Bahamas (1976), Bahrain (1990), Bangladesh (1985), Barbados (1976), Belarus (1956, as the Byelorussian SSR), Belgium (1962), Bolivia (1983), Bosnia and Herzegovina (1993), Brazil (1966), Cameroon (1984), Canada (1953), Chile (1995), China (1955), Croatia (1992), Cuba (1954), Cyprus (1986), Denmark (1954), Dominica (1994), Ecuador (1955), Egypt (1954), Ethiopia (1969), Fiji (1972), Finland (1954), France (1963), Germany (1973), Greece (1955), Guatemala (1983), Guinea (1963), Hungary (1958), India (1954), Iraq (1955), Ireland (1961), Israel (1955), Italy (1954), Jamaica (1964), Jordan (1959), Kazakhstan (2008), Kuwait (1963), Kyrgyzstan (1997), Lesotho (1974), Liberia (1953), Libya (1957), Madagascar (1964), Malawi (1965), Mali (1973), Malta (1966), Mauritania (1986), Mauritius (1969), Mexico (1954), Monaco (1954), Mongolia (1968), Montenegro (2006), Morocco (1959), Myanmar (1957), Nepal (1963), Netherlands (1955), New Zealand (1953), Nicaragua (1986), Niger (1964), Nigeria (1961), Norway (1957), Pakistan (1955), Paraguay (2007), Papua New Guinea (1982), Philippines (1955), Romania (1957), Russia (1956) (as the Soviet Union), St Lucia (1990), St Vincent and the Grenadines (1981), Saudi Arabia (1973), Serbia (2001, as Serbia and Montenegro), Sierra Leone (1962), Solomon Islands (1981), South Africa (1953), Spain (1927), Sri Lanka (1958), Sudan (1957), Sweden (1954), Switzerland (1953), Syria (1954), Tanzania (1962), Trinidad and Tobago (1966), Tunisia (1966), Turkey (1955), Turkmenistan (1997), Uganda (1964), Ukraine (1959, as the Ukrainian SSR), United Kingdom (1953), United States (1956), Uruguay (2001), Viet Nam (1956), Yemen (1987), Zambia (1973)

== Updates ==
The convention was amended by the protocol entering into force on 7 July 1955.

The definition of slavery was further refined and extended by a 1956 Supplementary Convention.

== See also ==
- Abolitionism
- International Agreement for the suppression of the White Slave Traffic
- OHCHR – Office of the United Nations High Commissioner for Refugees.
- Slave Trade Acts
- Supplementary Convention on the Abolition of Slavery of 1956
