= Élie Bois =

French journalist (1878 – 1941)

Élie Joseph Bois (1878–1941) was a French journalist who was editor of the newspaper Le Petit Parisien for 25 years.

Bois's speciality was international relations and he attended the League of Nations Assembly in Geneva each September. He supported the policy of Aristide Briand to maintain peace and was among the earliest to recognise the danger of Nazi Germany. His opposition to German propaganda caused conflict with his directors, who favoured collaboration. During the Battle of France in 1940, Bois was asked by Le Petit Parisien's management to publish a statement proclaiming that as editor he had followed a personal policy, which he refused. He subsequently ceased to be the paper's editor.

During the French collapse in June 1940, Bois sought refuge in Britain, where he worked for the Free France movement. He authored Truth on the Tragedy of France, which analysed France's defeat.
