= United Nations Library & Archives Geneva =

Library of the United Nations in Geneva

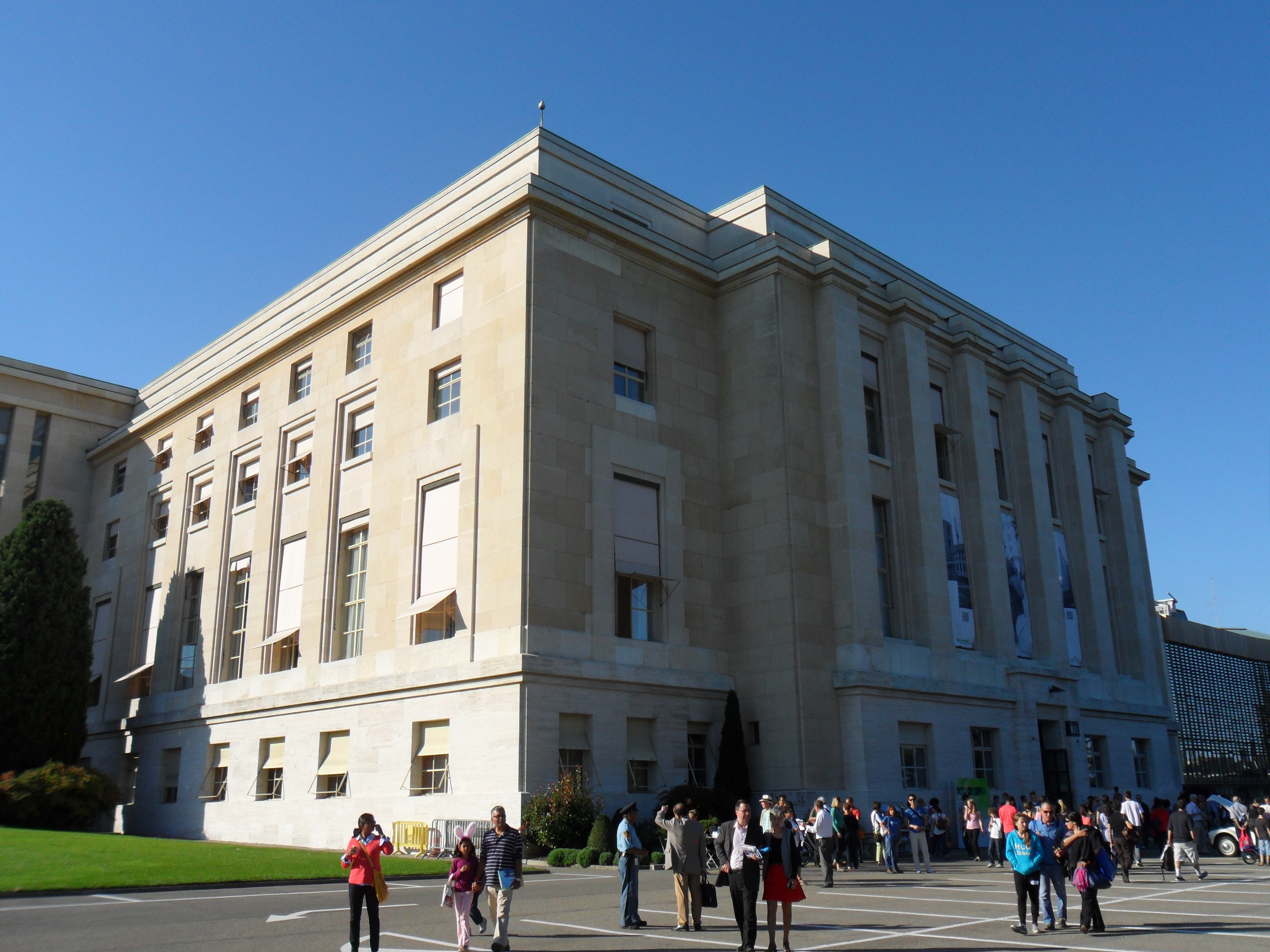
- 46°13′36″N 6°08′26″E
- Location: Palace of Nations, Geneva, Switzerland
- Type: Special library
- Scope: United Nations-related research
- Established: 1919; 107 years ago

Collection
- Items collected: Books, magazines, pamphlets, journals/periodicals, newspapers, official documents/publications, maps, microfilm/microfiche
- Size: more than 4 million print items

Other information
- Parent organization: United Nations
- Website: ungeneva.org/en/library-archives

The United Nations Library & Archives Geneva is part of the United Nations Office at Geneva (UNOG), located in the Palace of Nations.

The United Nations Library & Archives Geneva open their doors not only to UN staff and members of the diplomatic corps but to researchers, students and practitioners from all walks of life.

The United Nations Library & Archives Geneva, previously the League of Nations Library, was established in 1919 and became the UN Library following the transfer of the League’s assets to the United Nations in 1946. The United Nations Library & Archives Geneva aims to uphold the vision of John D. Rockefeller, Jr., who, in 1927, made a significant donation to the League of Nations that enabled the construction of the library and archives building “to serve as a centre of international research and an instrument of international understanding”.

== Collection ==
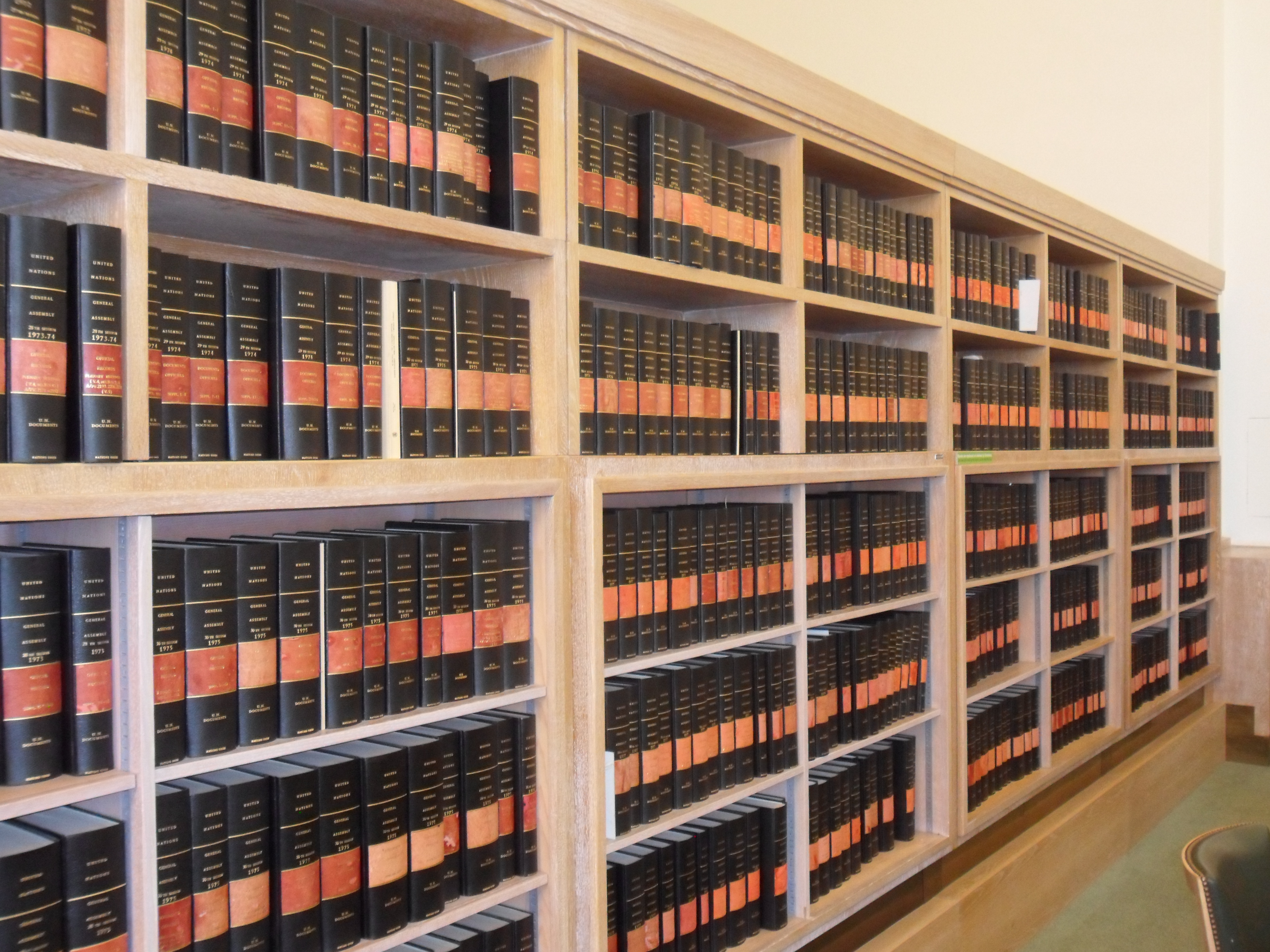
UN General Assembly Documents

The library and archives houses the largest United Nations documents collection in Europe. It also maintains a comprehensive collection of materials of the specialized agencies and the United Nations affiliated bodies. The collection, which comprises over four million printed items in the six official languages of the United Nations, encompasses the entirety of the Organisation's activities since its inception in 1946.

The United Nations Library & Archives Geneva collects books, periodicals and electronic resources to support the programmes and activities of the United Nations Organisation in a number of areas, including international law, human rights, multilateralism, diplomacy and international relations, disarmament, sustainable development, humanitarian affairs, refugees, economic and social development, environment, and more. It offers one of the richest collections in Europe in the fields of law, politics, and social sciences.

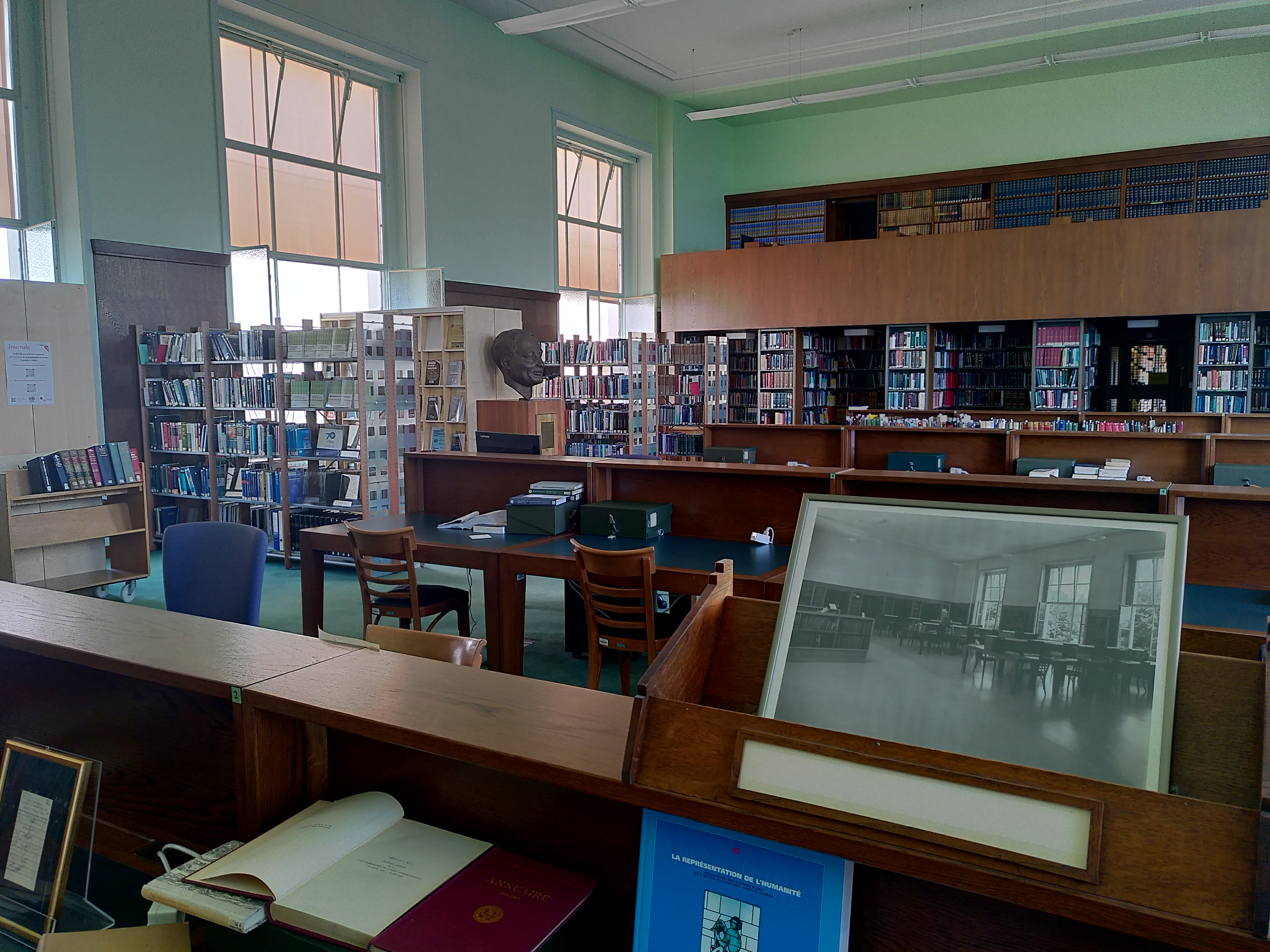
One of the different reading rooms (2024 and on a historical photo)

As the former library of the League of Nations, the collections also include notable books on peace from the pre-League period (XVIth-XIXth century).

Following the closure of the UNHCR Library in 2008, the institution's specialised collection was transferred to the UN Library & Archives Geneva.

Archival Fonds and Collections include those from UN Geneva Archives, League of Nations, International Peace Movements, and private papers. See the separate article: League of Nations archives.

The United Nations Library & Archives Geneva is also the custodian of a collection of more than 2,000 artworks dating from the League of Nations period to the present, most of them donated by Member States.

== Library & Archives building ==
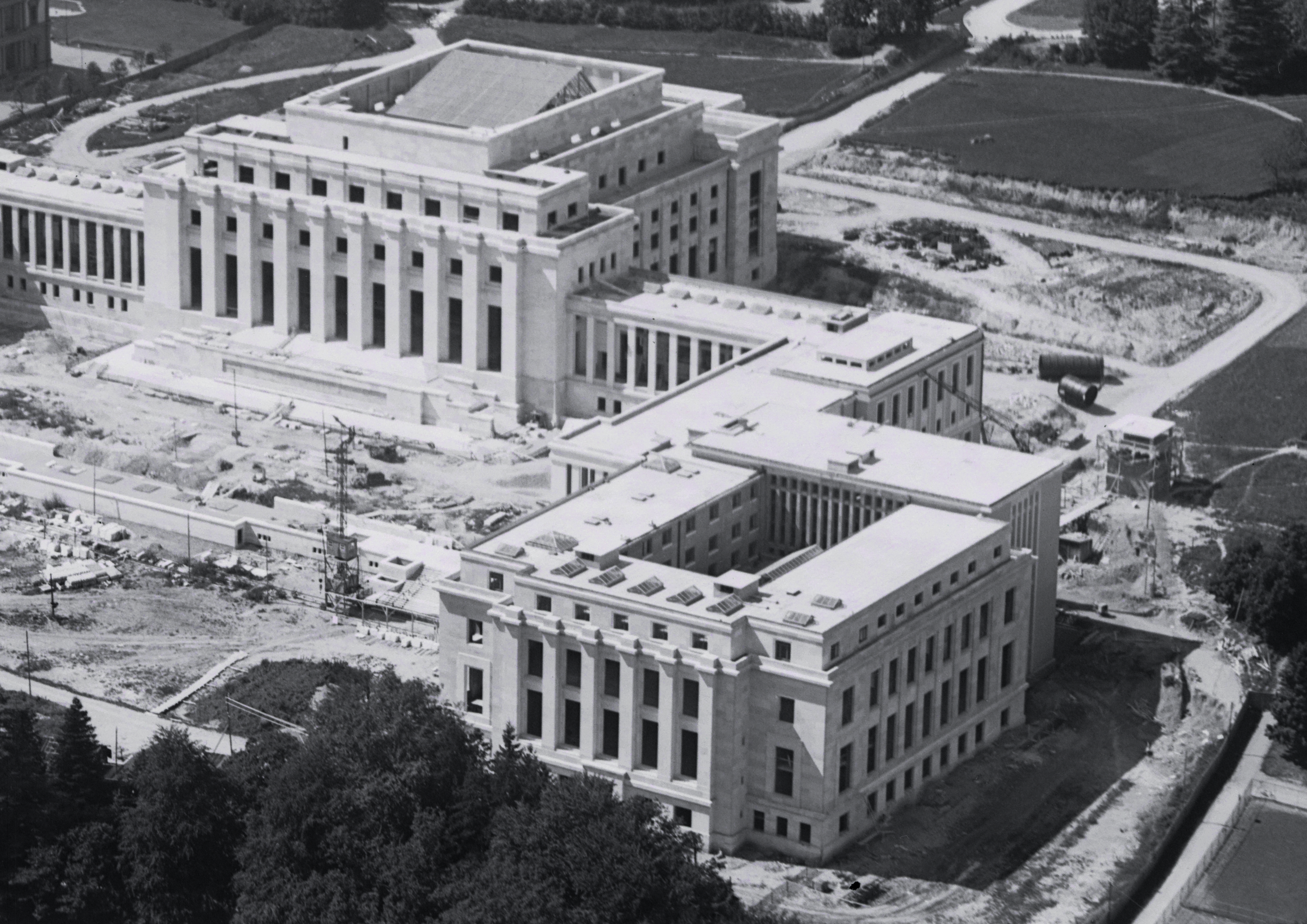
The Palais des Nations in construction with the library wing in the foreground (aerial photo 1934)

The United Nations Library & Archives Geneva is located in the east wing of the Palais des Nations. This part has a perfect square cross-section, 48 m x 48 m. There are several reading rooms. The library stacks are on the west side of the wing and have 10 levels. They were designed to hold one million volumes spread over more than 45 km of shelving. When it was built, this library was considered to be one of the most modern of its time.

Also located within the Library & Archives Building is the UN Museum Geneva.

== History ==
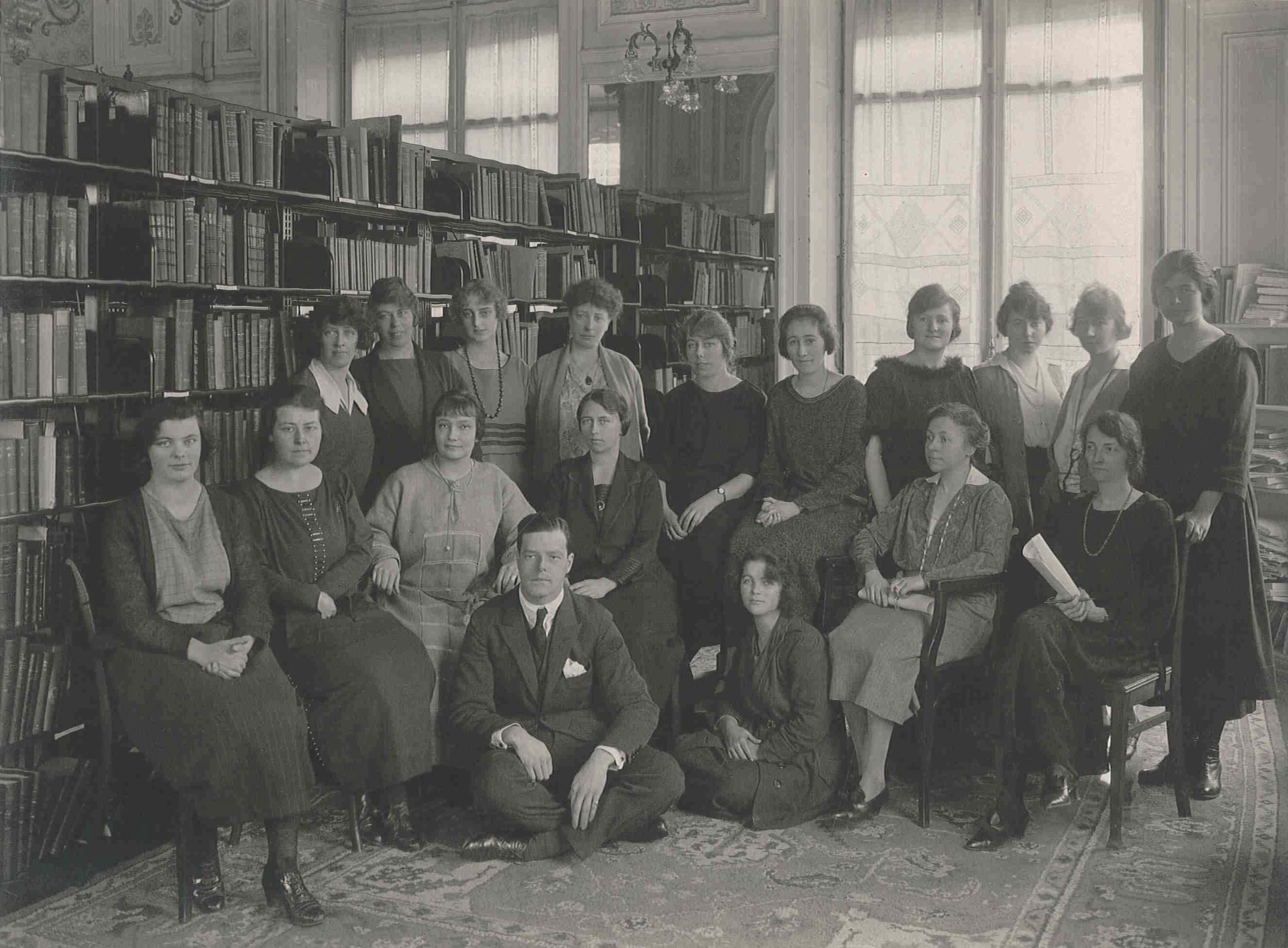
Librarians of the League of Nations

The Library & Archives of the United Nations Office at Geneva was previously the Library of the League of Nations, the United Nations predecessor, and was founded along with the League in 1919. The League Library was first housed in London. Mary-Florence Wilson, the first librarian not only organized the library efficiently, but also worked out ambitious plans for its development. The first staff list of November 1920 named 15 persons.

In November 1920, the League relocated to Switzerland, in the Hôtel National, a building on the shores of Lake Geneva that served as the League's provisional headquarters. Different ideas emerged as to how many staff, and therefore money, the library should have: frugal according to the European library model or generous with reference services as in the USA.

In 1926, as the League expanded its activities, an international of architectural competition was organized to design a permanent home for the organization. The result was the project for the future Palais des Nations (Palace of the Nations).

1927 John D. Rockefeller, Jr., an American industrialist and philanthropist, contributed two million dollars to endow the League of Nations with a modern library suitable for the study of international relations. The donation expressed Rockefeller's strong belief in the role of the League Library as a force to promote peace through knowledge. The architectural plans of the Palais des Nations were subject to significant alterations following the unanticipated donation. The library was situated in a distinct wing of the edifice. A Library Planning Committee was constituted with the objective of ensuring that the latest techniques and principles in librarianship were incorporated.

The League Library created a network of depository libraries, to which the official documentation was sent. In return, government documents supplied free of charge by the Member States played a very important role in the library’s collection of current information. They contained official data often not available from any other source. The library regularly received official documents and gazettes of the states, colonies territories, and other administrative units, official statistical publications and national law.

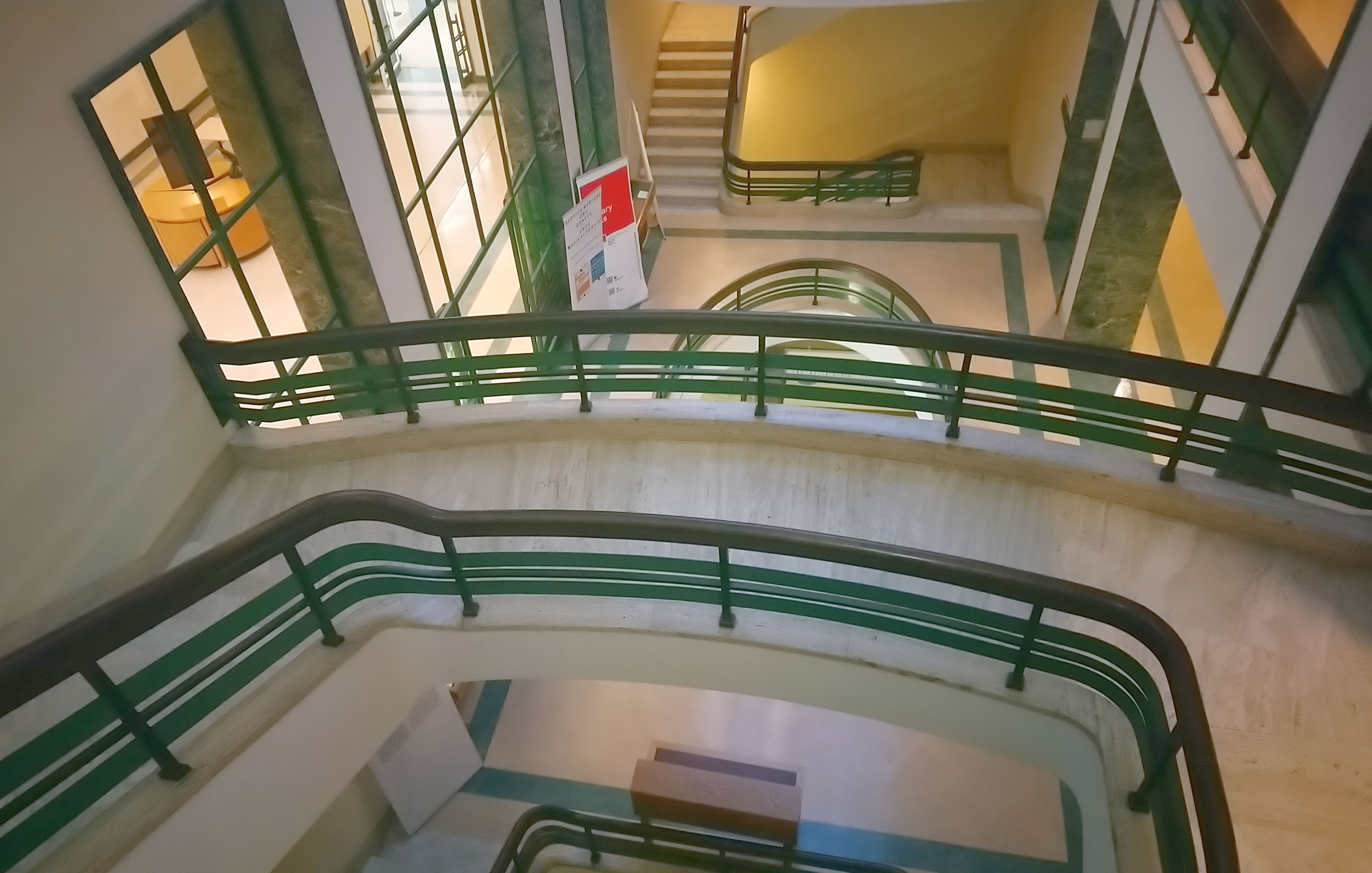
Main stair

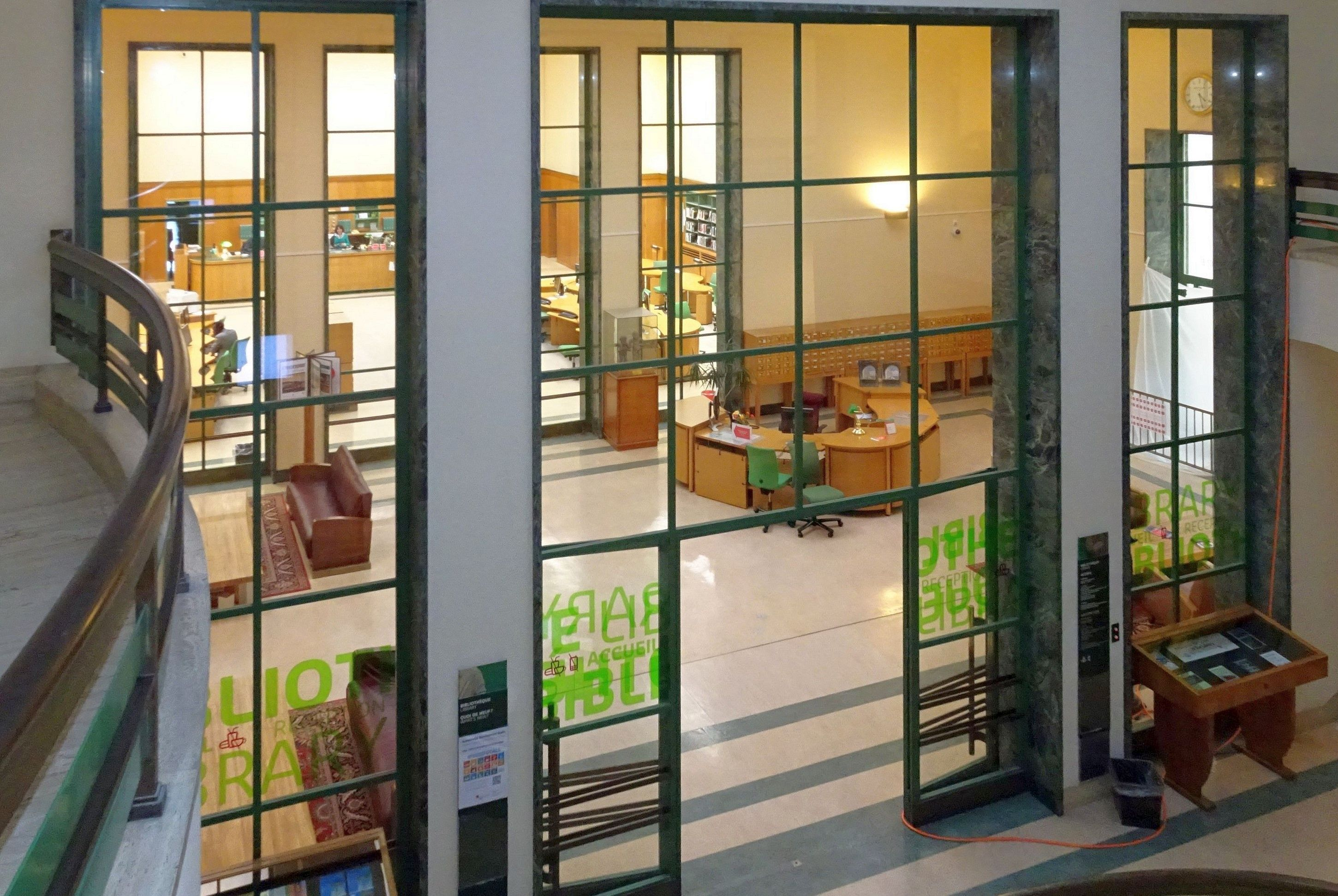
Entrance

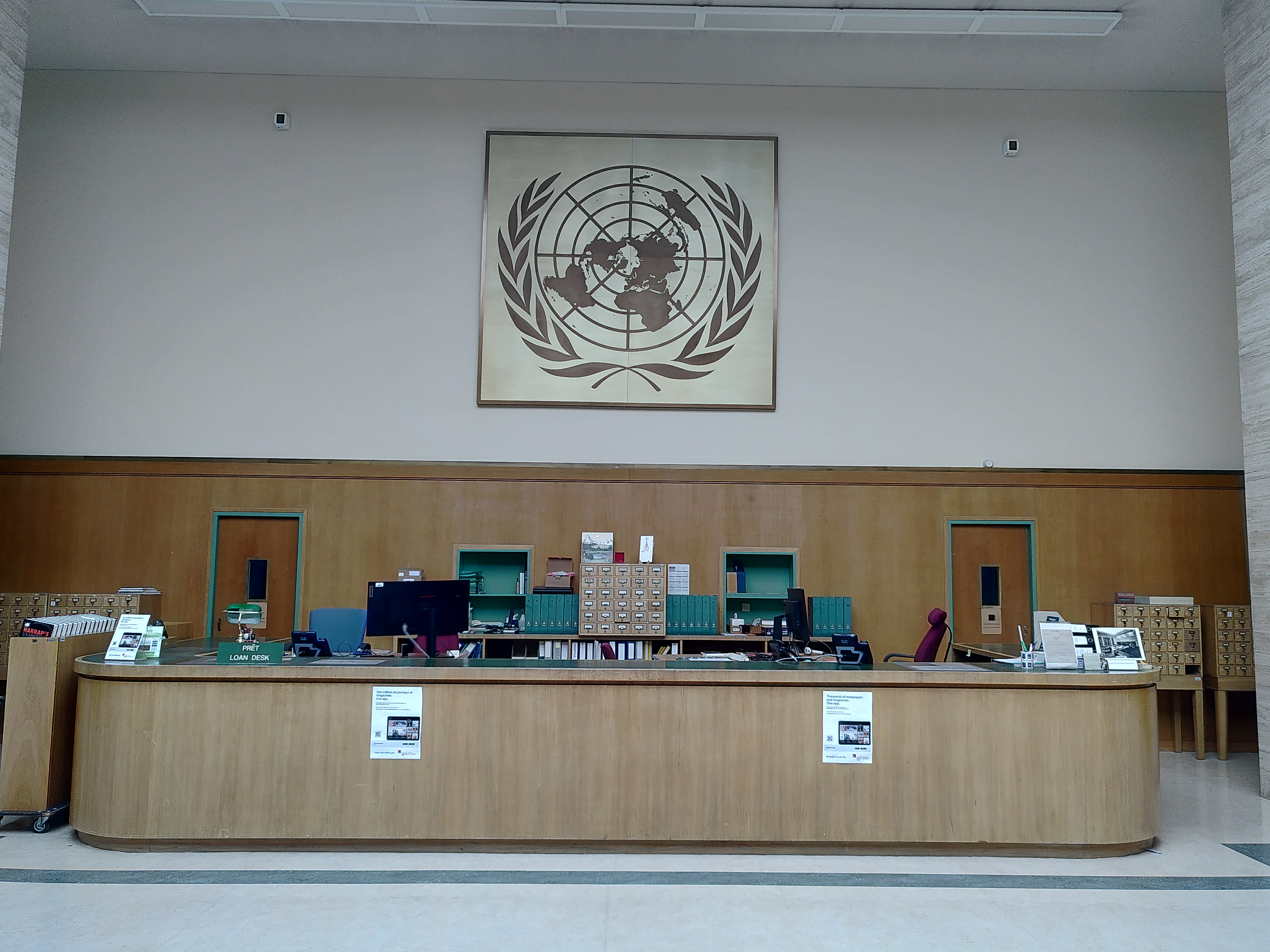
Welcome desk (2024)

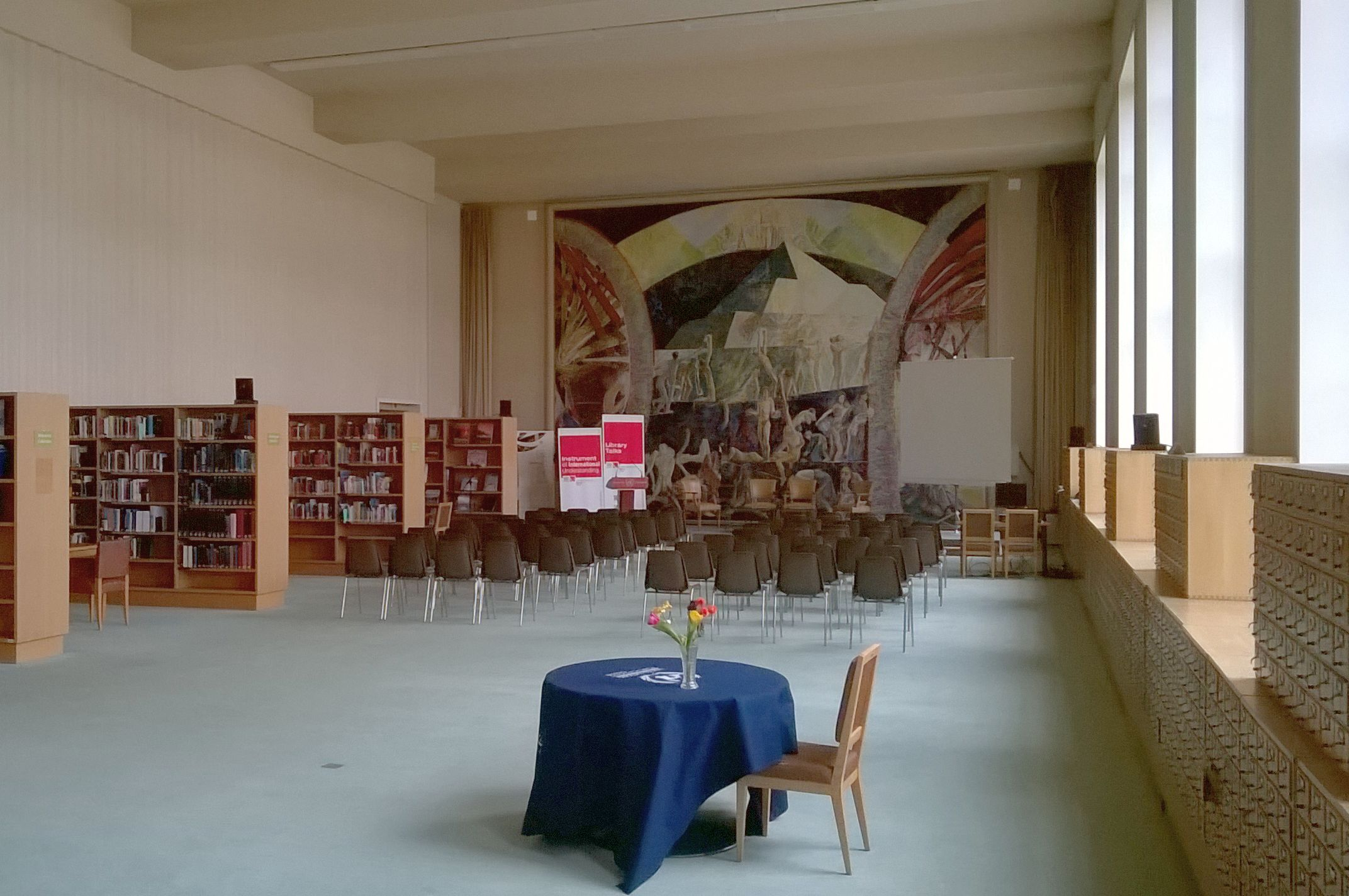
Hall

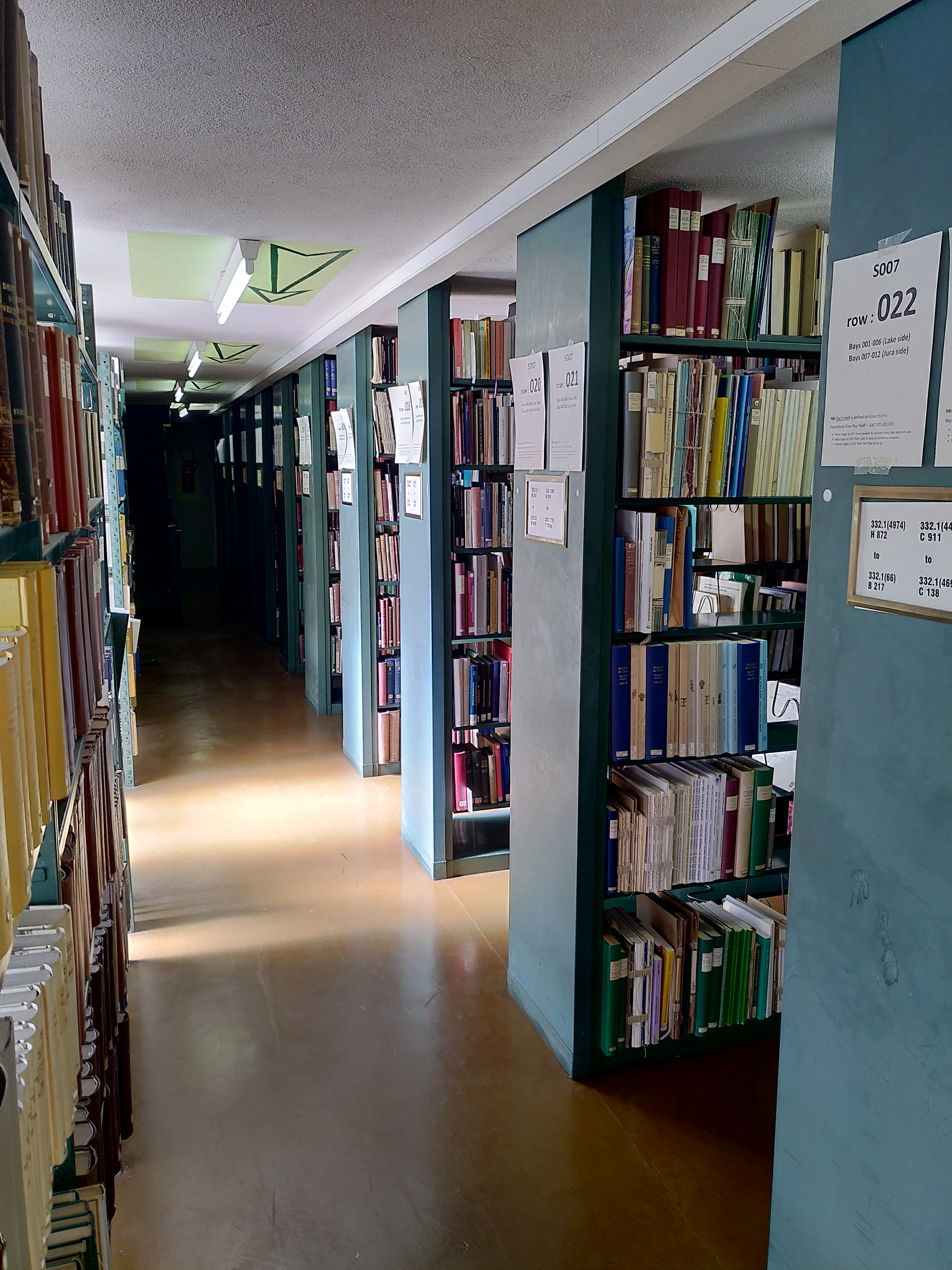
Bookstacks (2024)

In 1929, Tietse Pieter Sevensma, Chief Librarian was elected as first permanent Secretary General of the International Federation of Library Associations (IFLA). This is why the UN Library in Geneva became the IFLA's headquarters from 1929 to the World War II era.

On September 17, 1936 the first reading room in the new building was opened for use. Despite the Second World War, the library remained open. However, only two members of the original 24-member staff remained. Much of the material in the library was of interest in the conduct of military operations and of value to military intelligence services. The librarians therefore had to be careful when lending items.

In 1946, when the League was dismissed, the library, together with the other assets of the organization, was turned over to the United Nations. This was not a matter of course. For example the newly founded World Health Organization wanted to take over the publications on medicine and health.

In 1970 the library's collection was at approximately 615,000 volumes according to P. K. Garde. And he wrote that "it is considered to be the most comprehensive collection in Europe of official publications of member States of the United Nations." A large part of the library's acquisitions was obtained as exchanges and gifts. For example in 1961 the Swiss government made a gift of the complete collection of the library and archives of the International Peace Bureau, the oldest and largest semi-official international peace organization.

In 1970 the staff numbered thirty persons, of whom twelve were professionally qualified. They came from fourteen countries and speaking many languages.

In 1978, law librarian Thomas H. Reynolds assessed the importance of UN libraries on human rights issues as follows: "While the Dag Hammarskjold Library at New York headquarters has contributed impressive bibliographies to the literature of human rights and international law, one must not overlook the splendid collection of the larger but less publicized UN Library at Geneva which has become the major resource for documentary study of human rights and related subjects."

1984 the library progressively begins to participate in the computerized United Nations Bibliographical Information System, UNBIS database. Therefore the library's traditional card catalogue was closed in 1986.

1994, at the time of its 75th anniversary, the library's collections total over a million volumes, 500,000 governmental publications, 9,000 retrospective serial titles of which 4,500 were current periodical titles, and some 4,000,000 UN and specialized agencies documents.

The first Integrated Library System (ILS), McDonnell Douglas's URICA, was introduced in 1990. It was replaced in 1999 by Endeavour Informations Systems's Voyager. Voyager itself was replaced by Ex Libris's ALMA/PRIMO platform in 2014. Under the lead of UN Library Geneva, this system is shared by five UN libraries across the globe (besides Geneva, the Dag Hammarskjöld Library in New York and the libraries of ECLAC, Economic Commission for Latin America and the Caribbean in Santiago de Chile, of ESCAP, Economic Commission for Asia and the Pacific in Bangkok and of ECA, Economic Commission for Africa, in Addis Ababa). Through Global Search, the discovery tool, the catalogues and the e-resources of the five participant libraries can be searched simultaneously, giving access to a knowledge hub with more than 100,000,000 resources available.

In 1999, Administrative Instructions ST/IC/Geneva/4472 added three new library functions:

1. The management of the Exhibits Committee and Arts Committee within the framework of overall UNOG cultural policy;
2. The co-ordination of the archives policy at UNOG;
3. The management of the UNOG Working Committee on Publications

In 2010, the library started organizing regular conferences (the Library Talks) to promote exchanges among members of the international community, specialists, and the general public on UN-related topics.

In 2012, Room B.135, home to the Library Loans Desk, was repurposed as the Library Events Room. In 2018 the room became the Library Knowledge & Learning Commons.

The library is also in charge of organizing cultural events at the Palais des Nations.

In response to the COVID-19 crisis of 2020, the library has considerably developed its offer of online products such as:

- its research guides to facilitate access to online and print library resources on selected topics of particular interest (e.g., international law, human rights, climate change)

- its podcast, The Next Page, devoted to exchanges with diplomats and practitioners on the advancement of the cause of multilateralism

- its YouTube channel, with online tutorials on Library & Archives services and collections, as well as videos covering a wide range of Knowledge & Learning Commons, Cultural Activities, Histories and Library Events. A few documentaries are devoted to the Total Digital Access to the League of Nations Archives Project (LONTAD, 2017-2022) that resulted in the digitization of the whole League of Nations Archives.

== See also ==
- Dag Hammarskjöld Library
- League of Nations archives

== Bibliography ==
- Blandine Blukacz-Louisfert, The Library of the United Nations Office at Geneva - Custodian of League of Nations and United Nations Heritage, Paper presented at: IFLA WLIC 2014 - Lyon - Libraries, Citizens, Societies: Confluence for Knowledge in Session 201 - Government Information and Official Publications with Government Libraries. In: IFLA WLIC 2014, 16–22 August 2014, Lyon, France. (online)
- Jean-Claude Pallas, Histoire et architecture du Palais des Nations, 1924-2001 : l’art déco au service des relations internationales, Nations Unies, Genève 2001. ISBN 92-1-200354-0. Pages 256-269: Le bâtiment de la Bibliothèque
- Library chronology 1919-1995, Library news, United Nations library (Geneva), no. 1, spring 1995
- Bibliothèque des Nations Unies à Genève, Hors-Texte, Bulletin de l'AGBD, no.36, 1992/1
- Heinz A. Waldner, Documentation Activities of the United Nations Library at Geneva, Information Processing and Management, 1978, 14 (3–4), p. 135–40.
- G. Rozsa, United Nations library at Geneva: an international relations research centre. International Library Review, 1976, 8(2), 119–126. https://doi.org/10.1016/0020-7837(76)90023-6
- P. K. (Purushottam Krishna) Garde, The United Nations family of libraries, Asia publishing house, New York, 1970, Ranganathan series in library science, 22. ISBN 9780210222829
- Norman S. Field, La bibliothèque des Nations Unies de Genève, Revue de la Société Suisse des Bibliophiles, 11 (1968), https://doi.org/10.5169/seals-388088
- Norman S. Field, The United Nations Library at Geneva: Historical Background (Dec. 1968), MUN/592/68
- Muriel Hoppes, The Library of the League of Nations at Geneva. The Library Quarterly: Information, Community, Policy, vol. 31, no. 3, 1961, pp. 257–68. JSTOR, http://www.jstor.org/stable/4305126 (paywall)
- List of documents about the UN Library in Geneva: link
