= Little Treaty of Versailles =

1919 treaty establishing the independence of Poland

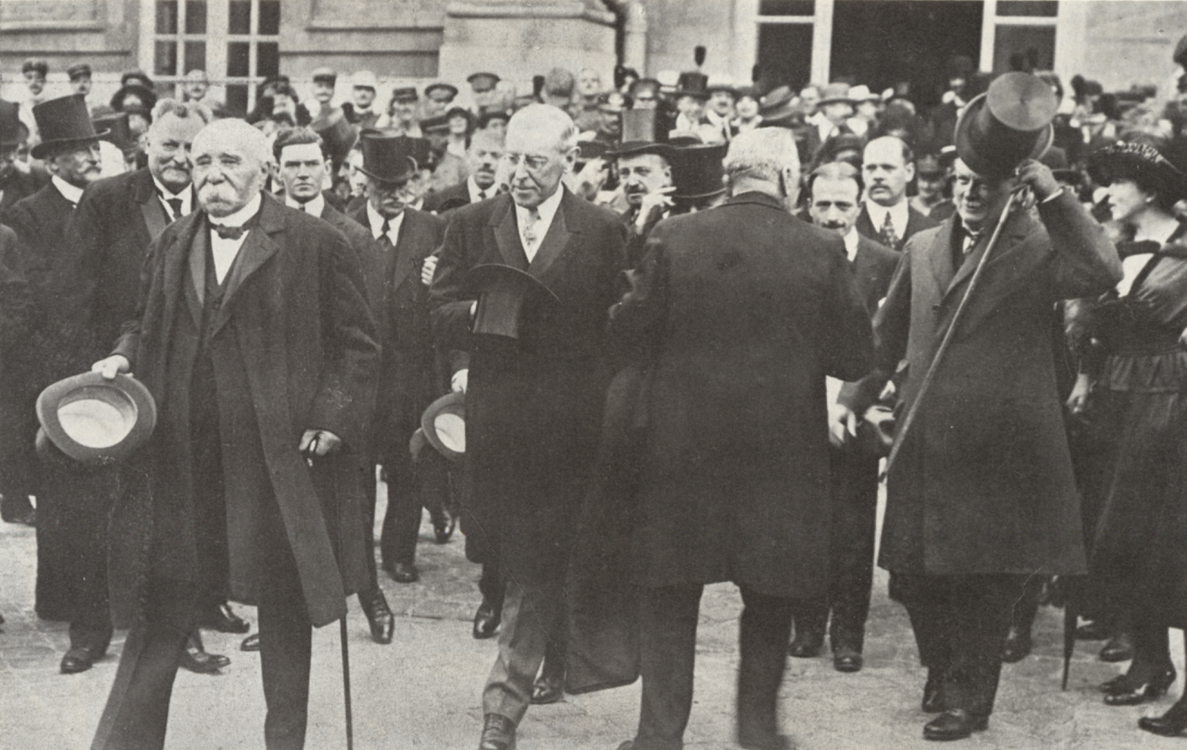
The Heads of government at the formal signing of the Treaty of Versailles in 1919

The Little Treaty of Versailles (Polish: Mały traktat wersalski) or the Polish Minority Treaty (French: Traité des minorités polonaises) was one of the bilateral Minority Treaties signed between minor powers and the League of Nations in the aftermath of the First World War. The Polish treaty was signed on 28 June 1919, the same day as the main Treaty of Versailles was signed, which is the reason for one of its names. It was the first of the Minority Treaties and served as a template for the subsequent ones.

== Background ==
Poland regained independence as the Second Polish Republic, after 123 years of partitions, in the aftermath of the First World War. The victorious powers decided that due to significant non-Polish minorities in areas claimed by Poland (which historically controlled many Lithuanian and Ruthenian territories under the Polish–Lithuanian Commonwealth and would likely inherit a substantial German minority within its new borders) and the ongoing civilian strife caused by the local wars (in particular the Polish-Ukrainian War of 1918-1919 and Polish-Soviet War of 1919-1920), Poland had to sign the treaty in exchange for Polish independence and for Poland to sign the peace treaty with Germany (the Article 93 of the Treaty of Versailles stated that: "Poland accepts... provisions... to protect the interests of inhabitants of Poland who differ from the majority of the population in race, language, or religion"). In addition, the treaty declared that Poland had to take over a part of debts of Russian state and grant a most favored nation clause in transit trade to "Allied and Associated States" (Articles 14-18).

== The treaty ==
The Polish government declared its support for "total and complete protection of life and freedom of all people regardless of their birth, nationality, language, race or religion" (Article 2) and religious tolerance (Article 7 which stated that "difference of religion, creed, or confession shall not prejudice any Polish national in matters relating to the enjoyment of civil or political rights, as for instance the admission to Public employment, functions and honors, or the exercise of professions and industries"). Provisions of the treaty "were obligations of international importance and were guaranteed by the League of Nations".

They could not be changed "without consent of majority of the League of Nations Council" (Article 12). National minorities could direct their complaints to the League of Nations Council. Difference of opinions "in legal or actual matters" between Poland and any of the western powers or any of the members of the League of Nations Council, which would result from provisions of the treaty was to have an international character (Article 12).

The treaty was signed by Polish representatives at Versailles (Roman Dmowski, Ignacy Paderewski) on 28 June 1919, the same day as the main Treaty of Versailles (hence it is known as Little or Small Treaty of Versailles. The parliament of Poland, the Sejm, ratified the treaty on 31 July 1919; the treaty was implemented on 10 January 1920. Poland renounced it at the League of Nations forum in Geneva on 13 September 1934.

== See also ==
- Warsaw Confederation
