= Immunity of Heads of State and State Officials for International Crimes =

2014 book by Ramona Pedretti

- Author: Ramona Pedretti, Dr. iur., LL.M.
- Publisher: Brill
- Publication date: November 2014
- ISBN: 978-90-04-28776-1

Immunity of Heads of State and State Officials for International Crimes is a 2014 monograph on international criminal law, written as the doctoral thesis of the Swiss jurist Ramona Pedretti. According to its publisher, the book provides a "comprehensive assessment of the rules of customary international law relating to immunity of Heads of State and other State officials in the context of crimes pursuant to international law and their relationship with core principles of international law".

The book gained popular attention after a tweet by the United Nations' Dag Hammarskjöld Library in New York announced it as "our most popular book of 2015" in January 2016. This led international media to quip about what this might reveal about the preoccupations of UN delegates and officials. The UN later clarified that the tweet meant to say that it was the most frequently used book among those acquired in 2015, which was to say that it had been "borrowed twice and checked out for browsing four times".
