= United Nations Digital Library =

Bibliographic database of the United Nations

- Arabic: مكتبة الأمم المتحدة الرقمية; French: Bibliothèque numérique des Nations Unies; Chinese: 聯合國數字圖書館; Russian: Цифровая библиотека Организации Объединенных Наций; Spanish: Biblioteca Digital de las Naciones Unidas
- Type: Digital library
- Established: 1979; 47 years ago
- Service area: Worldwide
- Branch of: Dag Hammarskjold Library

Other information
- Website: digitallibrary.un.org

The United Nations Digital Library is a primary bibliographic database of the United Nations established in 1979. It consists of the official documents and publications produced the UN System. It is managed and developed by the Dag Hammarskjold Library.

The database is regularly updated with the documents and records of the UN General Assembly, Security Council, and the United Nations Economic and Social Council.

It has maintained a record in digital format from 1982 to the present day on various subjects, including voting, bibliographic files, speeches files, full text UN resolutions, document series symbol, UNBIS thesaurus (dictionary or encyclopedia), and name authorities. https://digitallibrary.un.org/record/3956079/files/ST_SG_SER-A_81_E.pdf

== Features ==
It provides linked data related to a document within database text. A user may obtain information by applying a search filter to UN agencies, bodies, and type of document in English language. It also provides new content alerts (notifications). Search by publication date functionalities are also available while looking for a document.

== Documents ==
It consists metadata of about 1 million available in 6 languages. It digitizes thousands of publications annually focused on various types, including resolutions, reports of secretary-general, "meeting records, annual reports, agendas, lists of participants, statistical data sets, and policy papers".
