= League of Nations archives =

Collection of the historical records and official documents of the League of Nations

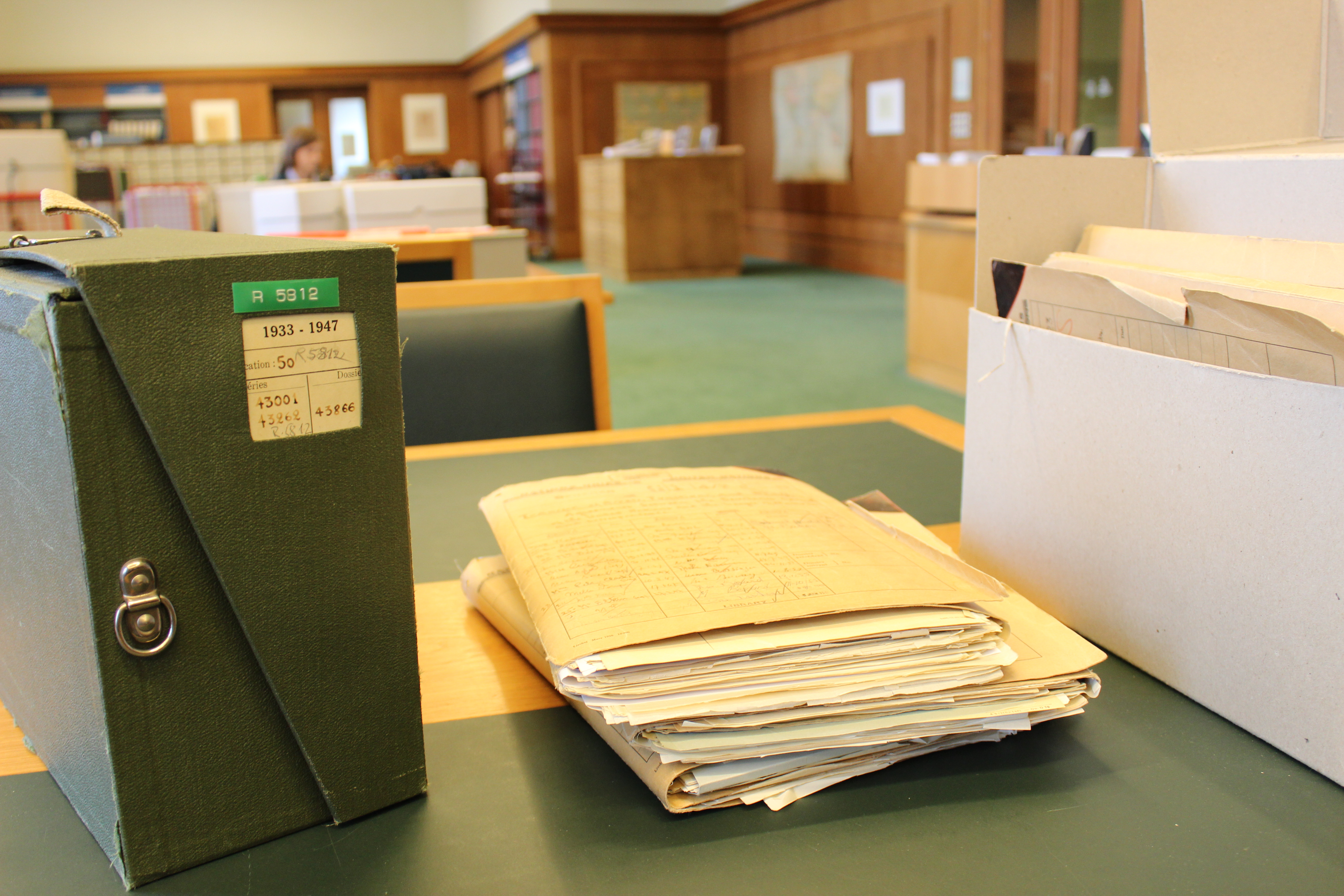
A researcher's set up of League of Nations archives in the John D. Rockefeller Jr. League of Nations and United Nations Archives Reading Room in Geneva.

The League of Nations archives is a collection of the historical records and official documents of the League of Nations. The collection is housed at the United Nations Office at Geneva (UNOG), where it is managed by the Institutional Memory Section (IMS) of the UN Library & Archives Geneva. It consists of approximately 15 million pages of content and comprises nearly 3 linear kilometers. A project to digitize the archives was launched in 2017 and completed in 2022. The League of Nations archives' historical significance is recognized by UNESCO, with its inscription on the Memory of the World Register in 2009.

== History and scope ==
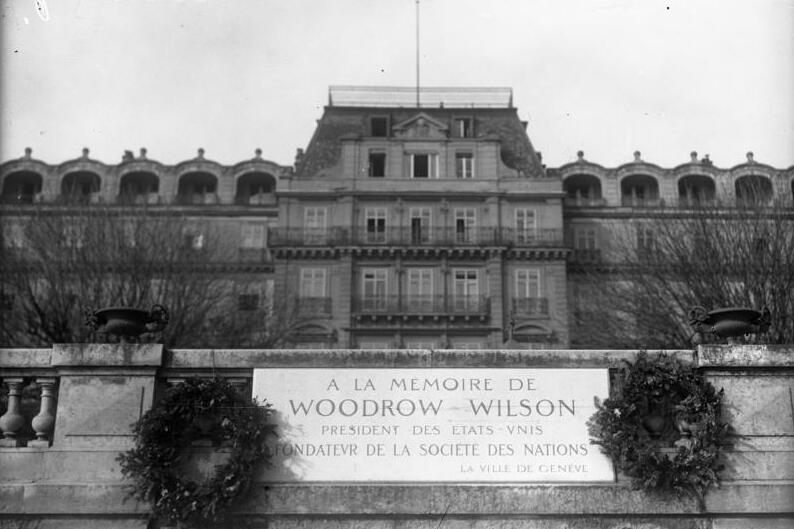
The Registry was responsible for the registration and processing of archives at League of Nations Headquarters. Pictured is the Palais Wilson, which served as Headquarters from 1920–1936.

Throughout its existence (10 January 1920 – 18 April 1946), the League of Nations created and stored records; however, its archives overlap its founding and dissolution, dating back to the negotiations of the Treaty of Versailles in 1919, and extending through the liquidation of the League after its closure in 1946. In general, the League kept records only as an aftereffect of its functions (i.e., without the intention of preserving its history). As early as 1919, the Secretariat of the League developed a Registry, which was responsible for opening files and keeping registers regarding administration as well as the League's official acts, particularly as embodied in the functioning of the Council and Assembly and their affiliated committees, commissions and conferences.

In 1946, the nascent United Nations received the League's records and registry documents. At the time, these were not considered to be an archive in the true sense of the term, and access was extremely limited. It wasn't until 1956, during their reorganization under the UNOG Library that they were formally recognized as separate from UN administration. However, access was still very limited, granted to researchers only on a very strict "merits" system.

In 1965, the Carnegie Endowment for International Peace proposed to finance a project to open League materials to researchers. The project commenced in 1966 and concluded in 1969. The main deliverable was the creation of the archives' primary finding aid, the Répertoire Général (accessible in External Links), corresponding to the change of the League's records and documents into a proper archive. Access to the archives was further defined by the official rules established in a two-page document titled "Access to League of Nations archives," published in the Secretary-General's bulletin in 1969.

== Structure ==
The League of Nations archives is a historical collection of the United Nations Archives at Geneva. It is arranged according to the administrative sections that existed during the time of the League of Nations, such as the Mandates Section, which focused on the administration of the territories under the mandates system as created by the Treaty of Versailles.

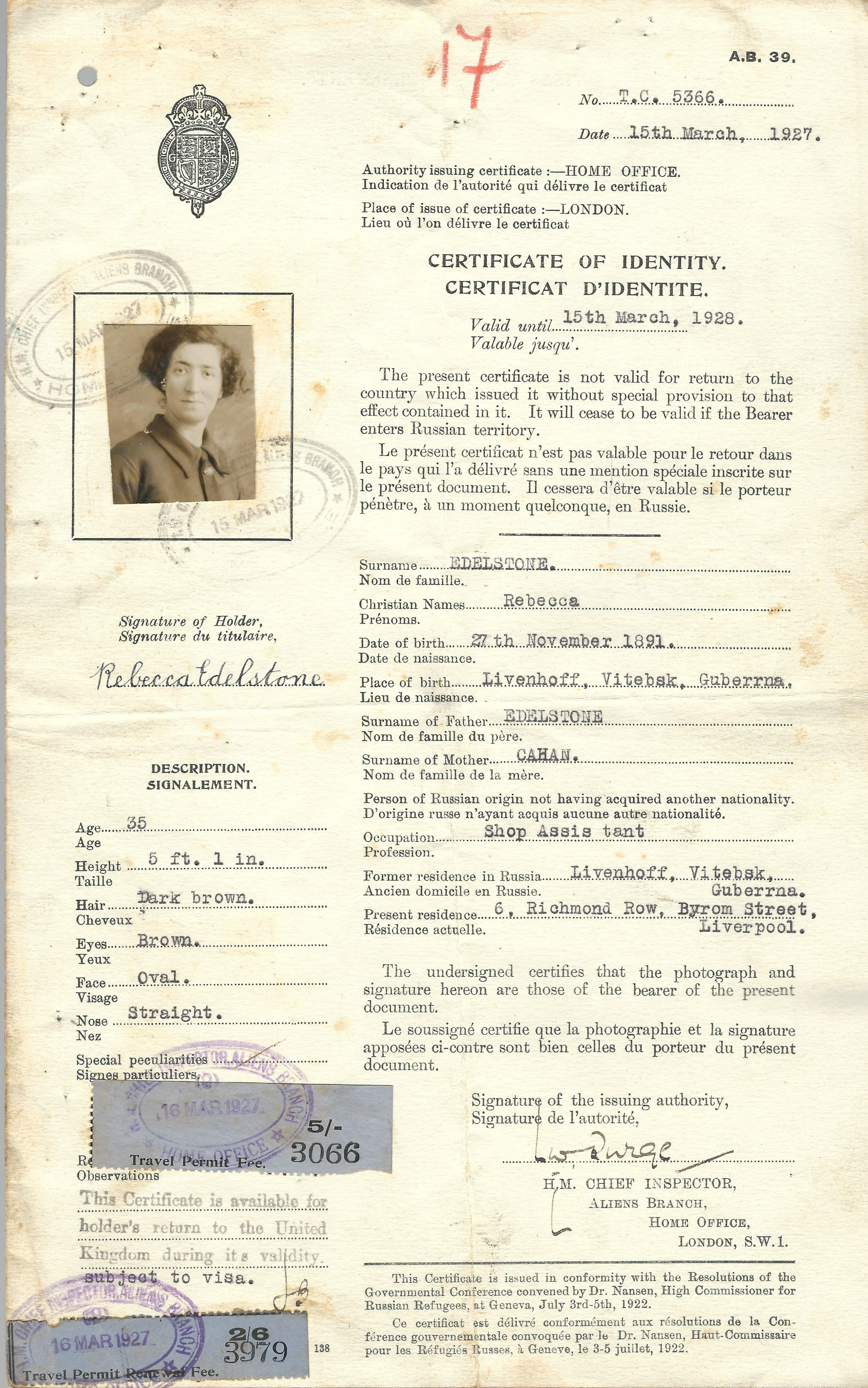
The League of Nations archives' Nansen Fonds is a hybrid of the Secretariat archive group and the External Fonds. It is named for Fridtjof Nansen, who as the High Commissioner for Refugees of the League of Nations invented the Nansen Passport (pictured).

The archives are divided into two main segments: The Secretariat archive group and the External Fonds. The Nansen Fonds (aka "Refugees mixed archive group") is the only section considered to be a hybrid of these two segments.

=== The Secretariat archive group ===
The Secretariat archive group encompasses archives that were produced or received at the League of Nations Headquarters in Geneva. It consists of the files established by the Registry, or files generated by certain sections of the League. These are known as Registry files and Section files, respectively.

==== The Registry ====
The Registry was the centralized function of the Secretariat that indexed and processed the majority of the records of the League of Nations according to official rules. Registry files are arranged in three different chronological periods: 1919–1927, 1928–1932, and 1933–1946.

==== Section files ====
Section files were spontaneously created and developed freely by the specific sections (e.g., Economic and Finance Section, Mandates Section, etc.). Accordingly, they have no "true official history." Due to their separation from the Registry, section files were organized by their respective section. Therefore, Section files tend to be less organized than Registry files.

=== External Fonds ===
External Fonds are archive groups of external origin, meaning that they were collected outside of the Secretariat. They were defined and controlled by the specific institutions that created them. Examples include the Saar Basin Governing Commission and the archives of the League's Berlin Office.

=== Collections ===
Aside from the two main segments, the League archives also contain "Collections," which are groups of material assembled independently of the League's administration. The main group of this kind is known as the collection of "documents" of the League.

== Destroyed or lost archives ==
Parts of the League of Nations archives were destroyed at different times for different reasons. Sections files, for example, were not necessarily subjected to the rules of the Registry, and this often resulted in sections destroying records for the sake of administrative convenience. On other occasions, destruction was the consequence of the wartime situation. The most serious losses are those of certain later section files, and the papers of the first two Secretaries-General.

Many External Fonds have been lost, subjected to wartime damage, and/or systematic destruction. To date the exact number of missing archives is unknown.

== Digitization project ==
In 2017, the UNOG Library launched the Total Digital Access to the League of Nations Archives Project (LONTAD), with the intention of preserving, digitizing, and providing online access to the League of Nations archives. Its fundamental aim is to modernize access to the archives for researchers, education institutions, and the general public. The project was completed in October 2022 and the entire archive of the League is now publicly available through a dedicated online platform.

== See also ==
- Dag Hammarskjöld Library
- International Council on Archives
- World Digital Library
