= Minority Treaties =

Legal agreements of United Nations and League of Nations members

The Minority Treaties^{[a]} are treaties, League of Nations mandates, and unilateral declarations made by countries applying for membership in the League of Nations that conferred basic rights on all the inhabitants of the country without distinction of birth, nationality, language, race or religion. The country concerned had to acknowledge the clauses of the treaty as fundamental laws of state and as obligations of international concern placed under the guarantee of the League of Nations. Most of the treaties entered into force after the Paris Peace Conference.

== Background ==
The protection of religious and minority rights had been a matter of international concern and the subject of protections ever since the days of the Peace of Westphalia. The 1878 Treaty of Berlin had a new type of provision that protected minorities in the Balkans and newly independent states' Great Power recognition was nominally conditional on the promise of guarantees of religious and civic freedoms for local religious minorities. Historian Carol Fink argues:

The imposed clauses on minority rights became requirements not only for recognition but were also, as in the cases of Serbia, Montenegro, and Romania, conditions for receiving specific grants of territory.

Fink reports that these provisions were generally not enforced—no suitable mechanism existed and the Great Powers had little interest in doing so. Protections were part of the Treaty of Versailles in 1919 and became increasingly important after World War II.

At the Paris Peace Conference the Supreme Council established The Committee on New States and for the Protection of Minorities. All the new successor states were compelled to sign minority rights treaties as a precondition of diplomatic recognition. It was agreed that although the new States had been recognized, they had not been 'created' before the signatures of the final Peace Treaties. Clemenceau noted in an aide-memoire attached to the Polish treaty that the minority protections were consistent with diplomatic precedent:

This treaty does not constitute any fresh departure. It has for long been the established procedure of the public law of Europe that when a State is created, or when large accessions of territory are made to an established State, the joint and formal recognition of the Great Powers should be accompanied by the requirement that such States should, in the form of a binding International convention undertake to comply with certain principles of Government. In this regard I must recall for your consideration the fact that it is to the endeavors and sacrifices of the Powers in whose name I am addressing you that the Polish nation owes the recovery of its independence. It is by their decision that Polish sovereignty is being restored over the territories in question, and that the inhabitants of these territories are being incorporated into the Polish nation.... There rests, therefore, upon these Powers an obligation, which they cannot evade, to secure in the most permanent and solemn form guarantees for certain essential rights which will afford to the inhabitants the necessary protection, whatever changes may take place in the internal constitution of the Polish State.

The new treaties gave minorities the right to appeal directly to the League or UN General Assembly. In the case of the Mandates and the UN Partition Plan for Palestine compromissory clauses provide for the International Court's jurisdiction. The victorious powers attempted to ensure the stable development of the region between defeated Germany and Soviet Russia, a region characterized by the existence of many ethnic groups and the emergence of new nations. The idea behind the Minority Treaties was that by subjecting those countries to the scrutiny of others and to the threat of sanction and intervention from the newly created international body, the League of Nations, the rights of minorities would be safeguarded.

As with most of the principles adopted by the League, the Minorities Treaties were a part of the Wilsonian idealist approach to international relations, and as with the League itself, the Minority Treaties were increasingly ignored by the respective governments, with the entire system mostly collapsing in the late 1930s. Despite the political failure they remained the basis of international law. After World War II the legal principles were incorporated in the UN Charter and a host of international human rights treaties.

Many international law norms and customary practices developed in the inter-war years by the League of Nations are still in use today. The procedures for managing intrastate and inter-ethnic issues include international supervision, regional economic unions, minority protection, plebiscites, and territorial partition. The Palestine and Bosnian Partition Plans and European Union practice are modern examples of conditioning recognition of statehood on human rights, democracy, and minority protection guarantees.

== Bilateral treaties ==
There were several bilateral Minority Treaties, each signed between one of the countries in question and the League. The treaties were signed between the League and some of the newly established nations: Poland, Yugoslavia (also known then as the Kingdom of Serbs, Croats and Slovenes), Czechoslovakia. Similar treaties were also imposed on Greece and Entente-allied Romania in exchange for their territorial enlargement, and on some of the nations defeated in the First World War (Hungary, Austria, Bulgaria, Turkey). At the same time, Albania, Lithuania, Estonia, Latvia and, outside of Europe, Iraq were persuaded to accept minority obligations as part of the terms of their admission to the League of Nations.

The Polish treaty (signed in June 1919, as the first of the Minority Treaties, and serving as the template for the subsequent ones) is often referred to as either the Little Treaty of Versailles or the Polish Minority Treaty; the Austrian, Czechoslovak and Yugoslavian treaties are referred to as Treaty of St Germain-en-Laye (1919); the Romanian treaty as the Treaty of Paris (1919), the Greek as the Treaty of Sèvres (1920); the Hungarian as the Treaty of Trianon (1920), the Bulgarian as the Treaty of Neuilly-sur-Seine (1919), and the Turkish as the Treaty of Lausanne (1923). In most of the above cases the minority treaties were only one of many articles of the aforementioned treaties.

=== List of unilateral declarations ===
- Declaration by the government of Albania, issued 2 October 1921.
- Declaration by the government of Lithuania, issued 12 May 1922.
- Declaration by the government of Latvia, issued 19 July 1923, heard by the Council of the League on 11 September 1923.
- Declaration by the government of Bulgaria, issued 29 September 1924.
- Declaration by the government of Greece, issued 29 September 1924.

=== List of bilateral treaties ===
- Austrian–Czechoslovak treaty, concluded 7 June 1920. Ratifications exchanged in Vienna, March 10, 1921. Registered in League of Nations Treaty Series on 29 March 1921. Supplemented by additional protocol relating to Carlsbad on 23 August 1920.
- German-Polish Accord on East Silesia (also called Geneva Convention), concluded 15 May 1922. The treaty dealt with the constitutional and legal future of Upper Silesia which partly became Polish territory after the Upper Silesia plebiscite of 20 March 1921.

=== List of multilateral treaties ===
- Treaty between the Principal Allied and Associated Powers and Poland (June 28, 1919), the so-called Little Treaty of Versailles;
- Treaty between the Principal Allied and Associated Powers and Czechoslovakia (September 10, 1919)
- Treaty between the Principal Allied and Associated Powers and the Kingdom of Serbs, Croats and Slovenes (September 10, 1919)
- Treaty between the Principal Allied and Associated Powers and Greece (August 10, 1920)
- Treaty between the Principal Allied and Associated Powers and Romania, signed at Paris on 9 December 1919 and went into effect on 16 July 1920. Ratified by the British government on 12 January 1921, by the Japanese government on 25 January 1921 and by the Italian government on 3 March 1921. Registered in League of Nations Treaty Series on 21 July 1921.

== System ==
The Minority Treaties were the basis of the League's system of minorities. Their aim was to protect the minorities without alienating the majority of the countries' population. The procedure was centered on the Council of the League (rather than the more encompassing Assembly) which had the right and obligation to raise complaints of treaty violations. Individual Council members had the unique privilege of placing complaints on the agenda, even through the petitions for that could be sent from any source. The majority of cases, however, were never handled by the council. Before reaching the Council, the petition passed through: the minority section of the Secretariat which selected the petitions according to some criteria (prohibition of violent language, integrity of the state, complaints about specific violations...), tried a first mediation and asked for supplementary information; the special committee of three that was appointed by the council and had the faculty of:

1. dismissing the petition
2. trying a second stage of mediation
3. submitting the question to the Council, which had the opportunity to seek a final agreement between the parties If the accused government and the League could not reach a satisfactory compromise, the final decision was referred to the Permanent Court of International Justice (most cases were solved by negotiations between affected governments before the International Court intervention).

== Importance ==
The Minority Treaties, recognized as history's first minority treaties, were an important step in protection of minorities and recognition of human rights, bringing the subject to an international forum. In them, for the first time, states and international communities recognized that there are people living outside normal legal protection and who required an additional guarantee of their elementary rights from an external body, as protection within individual states itself may not be sufficient. Among issues successfully resolved by the Minority Treaties was the Åland crisis.

Nonetheless, the treaties were also subject to past and present criticism. The countries subject to the treaties saw it as limiting their sovereignty and infringing their right for self-determination, as the League was allowed to influence national, religious and educational policy in those countries, and suggesting that they were not competent enough to deal with their internal matters. Further criticism centered on the treaties not being obligatory for the established countries (like France, Germany, United Kingdom or Russia). The Western countries, who dictated the treaties in the aftermath of the First World War, saw minority safeguards as unnecessary for themselves, and trusted that they could fulfill the "standard of civilization". It was the new Central and Eastern European countries that were not trusted to respect those rights, and, of course, Bolshevik Russia, still in the throes of the Russian Revolution, was a separate case.

This inequality further offended the smaller countries. Finally, this inequality also meant that the minority rights were not seen as a universal right; it was exclusively a foreign policy issue, and thus populations that had no state to back up their claims were relatively disadvantaged when compared to ones backed up by a powerful state or group of interests.

With the decline of League of Nations in the 1930s, the treaties were increasingly considered unenforceable and useless. The League Council, charged with enforcing the various minority treaties, often failed to act upon complaints from minorities. There was an unwritten rule that state policies aimed at the cultural assimilation of minorities should be ignored as the "minor evil" with regard to the rights enshrined in the Minority Treaties when those policies were seen as guaranteeing the internal stability of the state concerned.

When the Council did review cases, the reviews were commonly dominated by the countries whose ethnic groups were affected and that tried not only to resolve the problem of mistreatment of their minorities but also score other political goals on the international scene, sometimes even sacrificing the very minority in question (German and Hungarian governments are recognized as having abused the system the most). Also, of course, the League, lacking its own army, could not coerce any state to adhere to its recommendations.

Even before Adolf Hitler seized control of Germany in 1933, the problems with the Minority Treaties were evident. Various European governments continued to abuse minorities, the latter loudly protested, their complaints were exploited by interested parties with ulterior motives, and the League interfered as little as possible. The system suffered an apparent death blow with Poland's rejection of its treaty in 1934.

=== Renewed interest ===
Judge Sir Hersch Lauterpacht explained the legal effectiveness of the operation of this system of minority protection treaties. He pointed out the Court's determination to discourage the evasion of these international obligations, and its repeated affirmation of

the self-evident principle of international law that a State cannot invoke its municipal law as the reason for the non-fulfillment of its international obligations.

The United Nations established a formal minority rights protection system as an integral part of the Plan for the Future Government of Palestine.

The status of the treaties was questioned by the United Nations Secretariat in 1950, but a modern-day Chairman-Rapporteur of the UN Working Group on Minorities subsequently advised that no competent UN organ had made any decision which that extinguish the obligations under those instruments. He added that it was doubtful whether that could even be done by the United Nations. The provision that 'No discrimination of any kind shall be made between the inhabitants on the ground of race, religion, language or sex.' is enshrined in a multitude of international human rights conventions and the UN Charter itself.

Li-ann Thio, a professor of international and human rights law at the National University of Singapore noted that many international law norms and customary practices developed in the inter-war years by the League of Nations are still in use today. She specifically addressed the procedures for managing intrastate and inter-ethnic issues through (1) international supervision, (2) supranational integration, (3) minority protection, (4) plebiscites, and (5) partitions. She cited the Palestine and Bosnian Partition Plans and 1990s European practice as examples of conditioning recognition of statehood on human rights, democracy, and minority protection guarantees.

The International Court of Justice performed a legal analysis of the status of the territory of Palestine in order to determine the applicable law, before seeking to establish whether that law had been breached. The Court said that in addition to the general guarantees of freedom of movement under Article 12 of the International Covenant on Civil and Political Rights, account had to be taken of specific guarantees of access to the Christian, Jewish and Islamic Holy Places. It noted that minority and religious rights had been placed under international guarantee by Article 62 of the Treaty of Berlin, 13 July 1878, and observed that those "existing rights" had been preserved in accordance with the safeguarding provisions of Article 13 of the League of Nations Mandate and a chapter of General Assembly resolution 181 (II) on the future government of Palestine.

The United Nations Declaration on the Rights of Indigenous Peoples recognized the urgent need to respect and promote the rights of indigenous peoples affirmed in treaties, agreements and other constructive arrangements with States. It also noted that the rights affirmed in treaties, agreements and other constructive arrangements between States and indigenous peoples are, in some situations, matters of international concern, interest, responsibility and character. In many instances the minority rights treaties provided for arbitration and granted the International Court of Justice jurisdiction to resolve disputes.

== See also ==
- Diplomatic history of World War I
- International relations of the Great Powers (1814–1919)
- International relations (1919–1939)
- Treaty of Berlin (1878) – granting special rights and protection to some minorities under the Ottoman Empire
- Universal Declaration of Human Rights (1948) – declaration of United Nations, successor of the League of Nations

== Notes ==
a Sometimes also known as the Treaties on the Protection of National Minorities or Minorities Protection Treaties; the term Minority Treaties is the most concise of many names, and is used after Dugdale and Bewes (1926). The names of specific treaties affecting various countries vary from case to case.
