= Dag Hammarskjöld Library =

Library at the headquarters of the United Nations

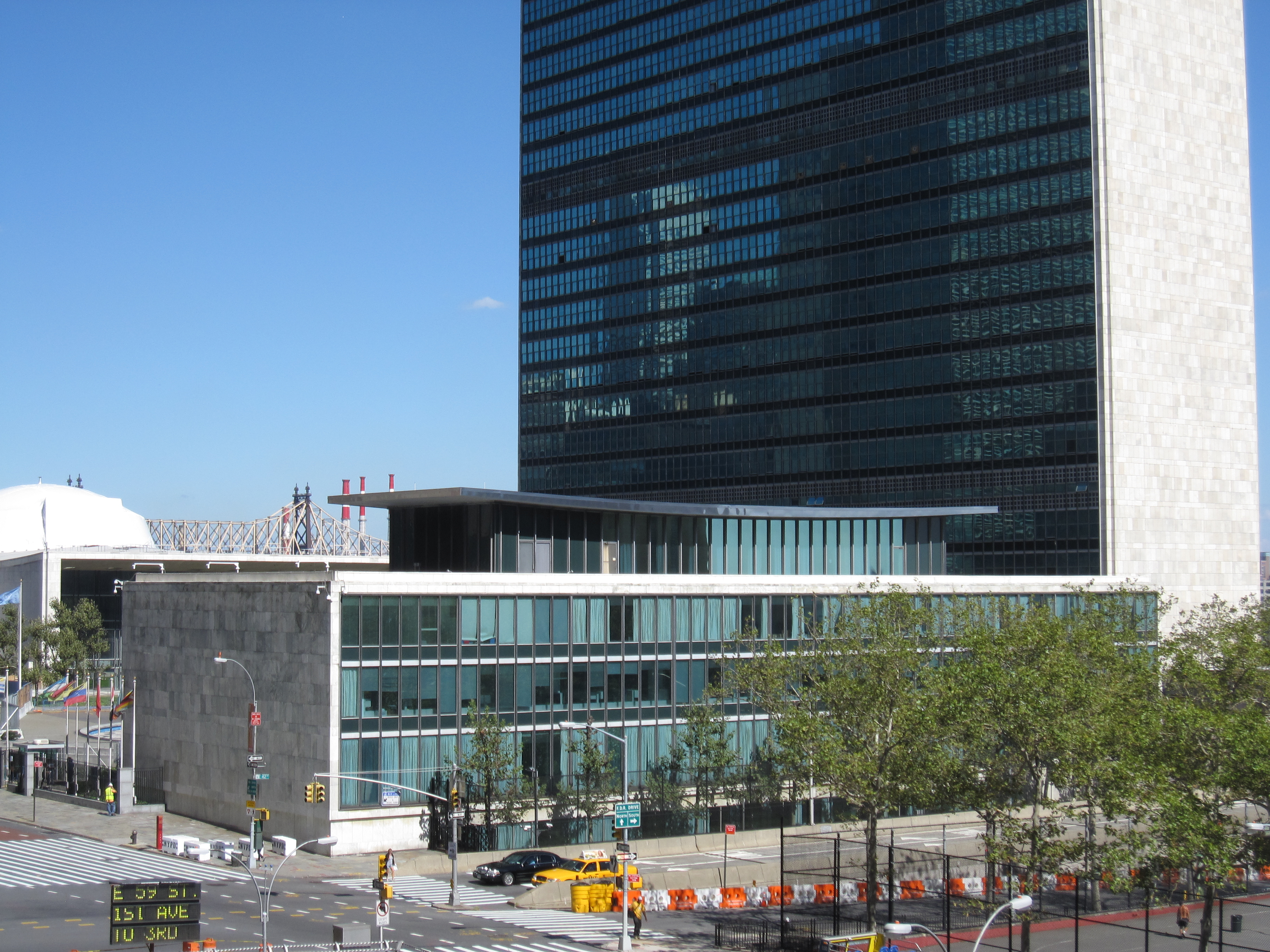
- The library (left) sits just southwest of the United Nations Secretariat Building (right)
- 40.748889°N 73.969167°W
- Location: Headquarters of the United Nations, United States
- Type: Special library
- Scope: United Nations-related research
- Established: 1946; 80 years ago
- Architect: Harrison & Abramovitz
- Reference to legal mandate: United Nations General Assembly Document A/C.5/298

Collection
- Items collected: Books, magazines, pamphlets, journals/periodicals, newspapers, official documents/publications, maps, microfilm/microfiche
- Size: 400,000+

Access and use
- Access requirements: Delegates of Permanent Missions and UN Secretariat staff

Other information
- Parent organization: United Nations
- Website: www.un.org/library

The Dag Hammarskjöld Library is a library on the grounds of the headquarters of the United Nations, located in the Turtle Bay and East Midtown neighborhoods of Manhattan in New York City. It is connected to the Secretariat and Conference buildings through ground level and underground corridors. It is named after Dag Hammarskjöld, the second secretary-general of the United Nations. The library was founded in 1946, and the current library building was completed in 1961.

The library provides research and reference services to staff of the UN Secretariat as well as members of UN permanent missions. Additionally, the library is the main depository for United Nations documents and publications and maintains a selected collection of materials of the specialized agencies and United Nations affiliated bodies, as well as a collection of books, periodicals and other materials related to the organization's programs of activities. The library also produces a digital library of UN materials, an index to the proceedings and documentation of the major UN bodies, as well as providing research guides for finding UN-related material and information. The library also supports the network of UN libraries throughout the world by supporting collaborative information resource purchasing.

== History ==
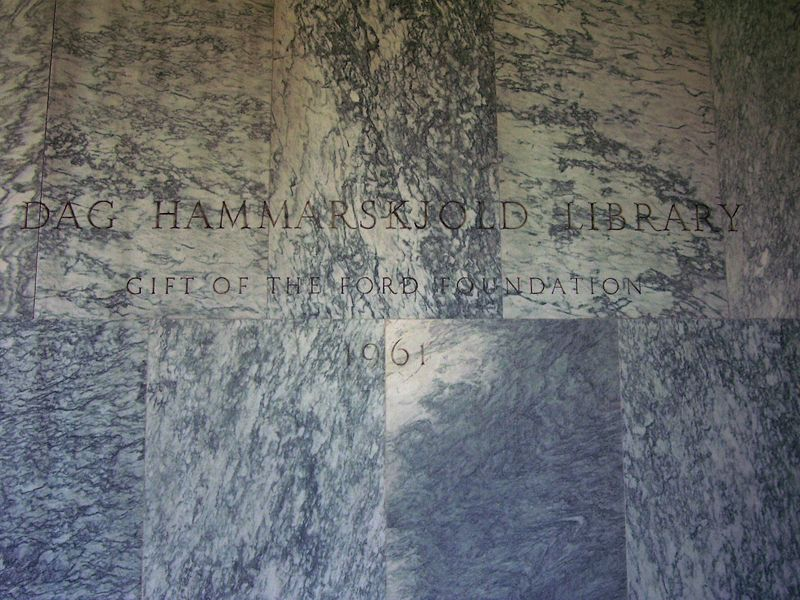
Etched-on-marble entrance sign

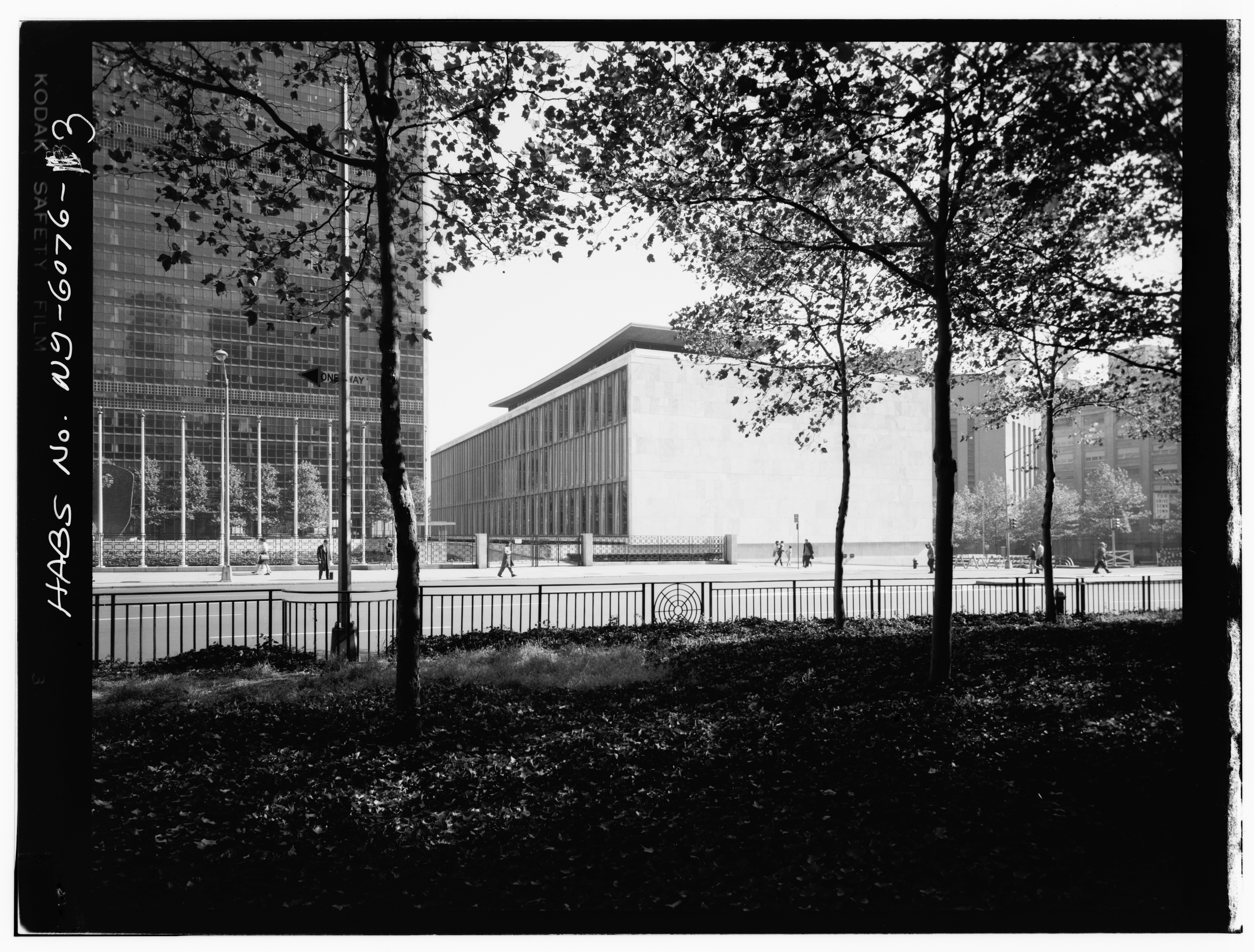
Photo of the library, taken in 1966

The Library was founded along with the United Nations in 1946. It was originally called the United Nations Library, and later the United Nations International Library. Its creation was recommended by the 1945 report of the Preparatory Commission of the United Nations, which called for a "library with research and reference facilities" to be included in the Department Conference and General Services, now the Department of General Assembly Affairs and Conference Services.

Its responsibilities were further expanded upon in 1949 by the General Assembly, who decided that the primary function of the Library should be "to enable the delegations, Secretariat and other official groups of the Organization to obtain...the library materials and information needed in the execution of their duties." The 1949 document also stipulated that the services of the Library would also be made available to the specialized agencies of the United Nations, as well as select members of the public, such as, international governmental organizations, educational institutions, scholars and writers.

A new library building for the UN headquarters was proposed in 1952. By that time, it was recognized that the existing UN library, a 6-story structure formerly owned by the New York City Housing Authority (NYCHA), was too small. The NYCHA building could only hold 170,000 books, whereas the UN wanted to host at least 350,000 to 400,000 books in its library. The new facility was slated to cost $3 million. By 1955, the collection was housed in the Secretariat Building and held 250,000 volumes in "every language of the world", according to The New York Times. A 1959 report by Secretary-General Dag Hammarskjöld found that the building "provides no further opportunity for expansion and prohibits the growth of the Library to that level which would seem commensurate with the fulfilment of its purposes."

In 1959, the Ford Foundation gave a grant of $6.2 million to the United Nations for the construction of a new Library building which would be "of the highest quality, aesthetically designed, furnished, and equipped in conformity with the most modern library standards." In recognition of their donation, the General Assembly instructed the Secretary-General to place a memorial stone at the entrance of the library inscribed with "Gift of the Ford Foundation."

Secretary-General Dag Hammarskjöld was instrumental in securing the funding for the new building. A letter from the President of the Ford Foundation to the president of the General Assembly after Hammarskjold's death stated that it was the late Secretary-General's active interest and lobbying in the project to fund a new United Nations library that was a decisive factor in the Foundation's donation. The new building was dedicated on November 16, 1961, just two months after Hammarskjöld's death, and was renamed in his honor.

== Functions ==
The Library's primary functions are laid out in a 1949 Document from the Fifth Committee of the United Nations:

- The Library is responsible for all library services at Headquarters and for the acquisition of all library materials.
- The Library's primary function is to enable the delegations, Secretariat and other official groups of the Organization to obtain, with the greatest possible speed, convenience and economy, the Library materials and information needed in the execution of their duties.
- The services of the Library will also be made available, as far as feasible, to United Nations specialized agencies, accredited representatives of mass media, international governmental organizations, affiliated non-governmental organizations, educational institutions, scholars and writers.
- The Headquarters Library is responsible for indexing United Nations documents and publications.

The Library is not open to the general public. However, it does provide access to much UN-related information by developing freely accessible online resources and services, and via UN depository libraries worldwide.

== Resources and services ==
The library has created a number of research tools and services to ease access to United Nations documents:

- The Index to Proceedings (ITP) is a series of print indexes, especially useful for research on matters prior to 1979. It provides citation to the parliamentary documentation of the principal organs. Each index has two parts: a subject index and an index to speeches delivered.
- The UN Documentation Research Guides present an overview of selected UN documents, publications, databases and websites. Available in Arabic, Chinese, English, French, Russian and Spanish.
- Ask Dag is a database providing hundreds of answers about the United Nations, its documentation, as well as the services and resources offered by the Library. Available in English, French and Spanish.
- The UNBIS Thesaurus is a multilingual database of the controlled vocabulary used to describe UN documents and other materials in the Library's collection. Available in Arabic, Chinese, English, French, Russian and Spanish.
- UN Member States on the Record: Provides access to the key documents for each Member State related to its membership in the UN, statements made before the principal organs, draft resolutions sponsored, periodic reports submitted on Human Rights conventions. Available in Arabic, Chinese, English, French, Russian and Spanish.
- United Nations Digital Library: The Digital Library includes UN documents, voting data, speeches, maps, and open access publications. The platform provides access to UN-produced materials in digital format and bibliographic records for print UN documents starting in 1979. System features include linked data between related documentation such as resolutions, meeting records and voting, and refining of searches by UN body, agency or type of document. Available in Arabic, Chinese, English, French, Russian and Spanish. A former system operated by the library known as UNBISnet has been phased out.

== See also ==
- United Nations Library & Archives Geneva
- League of Nations archives
- Total Digital Access to the League of Nations Archives Project (LONTAD)
