= Palais Wilson =

Headquarters of the Office of the UN High Commissioner for Human Rights

Coordinates: 46.2149°N 6.1510°E

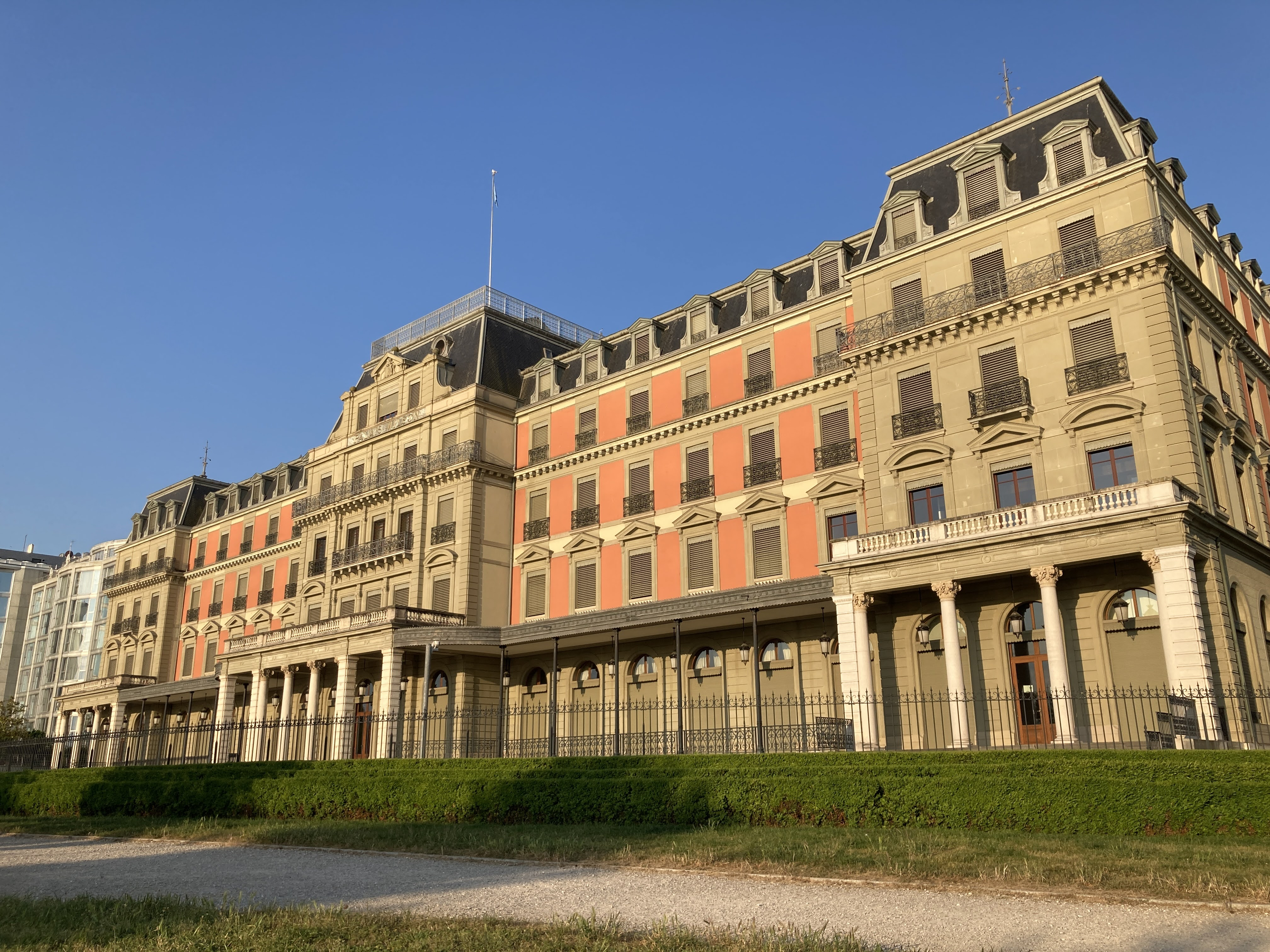
Palais Wilson

The Palais Wilson (Wilson Palace) in Geneva, Switzerland, is the current headquarters of the Office of the United Nations High Commissioner for Human Rights. It was also the headquarters of the League of Nations from 1 November 1920 until that body moved its premises to the Palais des Nations on 17 February 1936, which was constructed between 1929 and 1938, also in Geneva. In 1924, the building was named after U.S. president Woodrow Wilson, who was instrumental to the foundation of the League of Nations. The treaty bodies also hold their sessions in the Palais Wilson. In 1932, a glass annex was built to host the 1932 Conference on Disarmament. The Secretariat of the International Bureau of Education occupied the building from 1937 to 1984. The annex was destroyed in a fire in 1987.

The building, located on the western side of Lake Geneva, is one of the most prominent on the waterfront. The five-story and 225-room building by Lake Geneva was originally constructed between 1873 and 1875 for use by the Hôtel National. When Switzerland joined the then newly created League of Nations in 1920, the premises became the world body's headquarters.
