= 2018 Kuwait–Philippines diplomatic crisis =

Diplomatic crisis between the Philippines and Kuwait over concerns on migrant workers

- Date: January–May 2018
- Type: Diplomatic crisis
- Theme: Labor relations
- Cause: Discovery of the murder of a Joanna Demafelis, a Filipino migrant worker
- Motive: Improvement of working conditions for Filipino migrant workers
- Participants: Governments of Kuwait and the Philippines
- Outcome: Crisis: Total labor deployment ban for Filipino migrant workers to Kuwait (informally since January 2018; February 2018 to May 2018); Expulsion of Philippine Ambassador to Kuwait; Recall of Kuwait envoy in Manila; Resolution: Conviction for Demafelis' killers, in absentia; Agreement on labor relations signed; Memorandum on agreement on labor relations signed
- Arrests: Nader Essam Assaf and his wife (February 2018)
- Convictions: Murder (April 2018), in absentia
- Sentence: Death by hanging

In early 2018, Kuwait and the Philippines were embroiled in a diplomatic crisis over the situation of Filipino migrant workers in the Persian Gulf country.

The diplomatic row was triggered by the grisly discovery of the corpse of Filipina domestic worker Joanna Demafelis, hidden inside a freezer in an abandoned building since November 2016. In response to the discovery, Philippines President Rodrigo Duterte ordered the suspension of deployment of Filipino migrant workers to Kuwait, and organized a voluntary repatriation program for Filipinos already working in Kuwait. Although the move was criticized by the Kuwaiti government, both the Philippines and Kuwait went on to cooperate regarding the Demafelis murder case, leading to the conviction of Demafelis' killers in absentia as well as improving the working conditions faced by Filipino migrant workers in Kuwait in general.

However, relations were further strained in late April after a video emerged showing Philippine embassy officials purportedly rescuing Filipino maids from allegedly abusive employers. Kuwait called the operations as a violation of its sovereignty, expelled the Philippine Ambassador to Kuwait and recalled its own envoy in Manila.

== Background ==
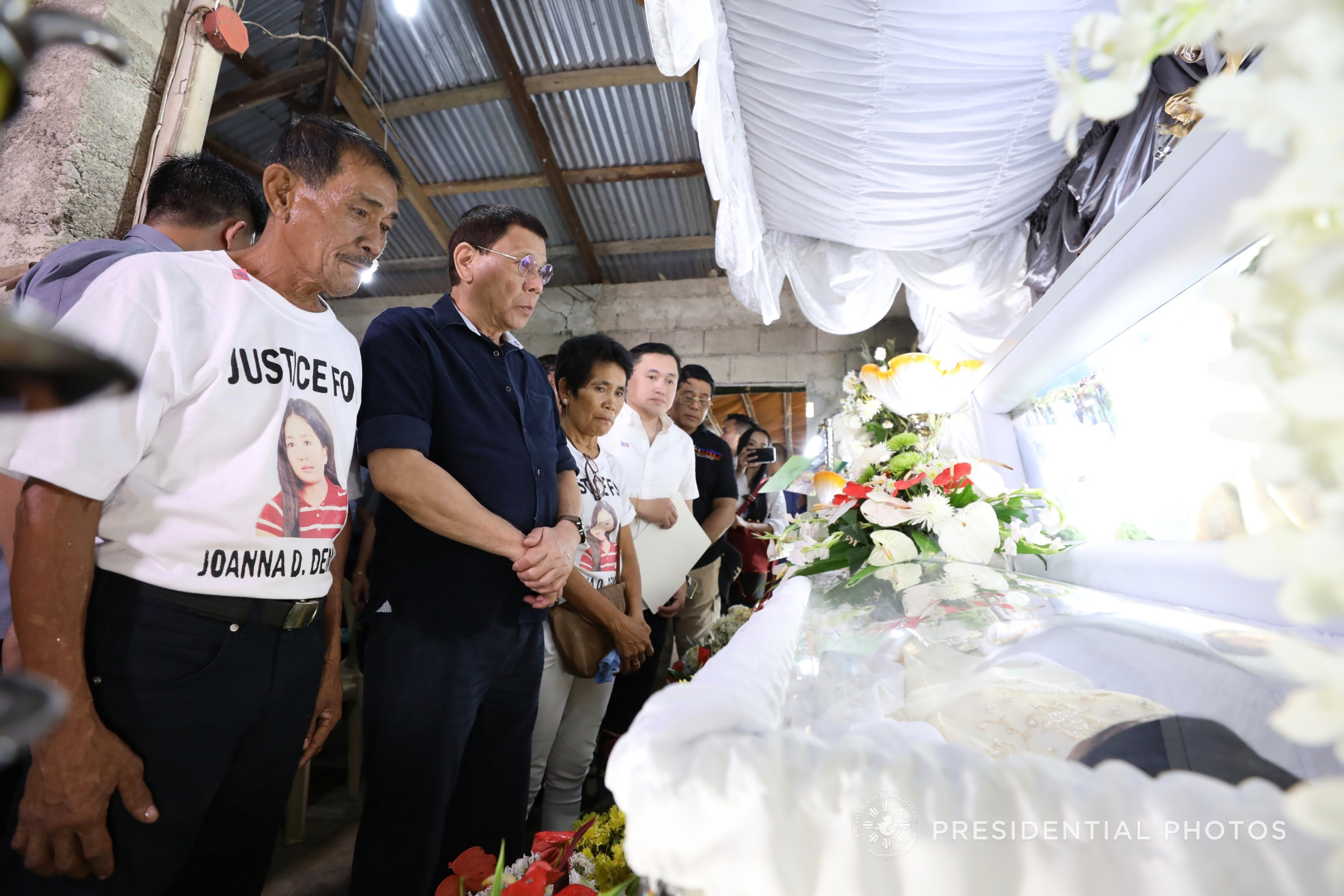
President Rodrigo Duterte (2nd from left) pays his last respects to Joanna Demafelis during the wake at her residence in Iloilo on February 22, 2018.

A diplomatic crisis between Kuwait and the Philippines began when the killing of Joanna Demafelis, a Filipina domestic worker in Kuwait, came to public attention in 2018.

On January 19, 2018 Philippine Department of Labor and Employment directed its staff to stop processing deployment certificates for all Kuwait-bound workers effective immediately, after the series of recent deaths of Filipina domestic workers in Kuwait was mentioned by President Rodrigo Duterte in his widely televised speech the day before. Duterte thus requested a total ban on deployment of Philippine workers to Kuwait.

The murder of Joanna Demafelis was the particular incident that led to the ban. Demafelis had been killed two years earlier, but her death only came to public attention when her remains were found inside a freezer in a warehouse abandoned since November 2016.

It was on February 12, 2018, that DOLE officially began enforcing its deployment ban of Filipino migrant workers to Kuwait. It was clarified that Filipino seafarers boarding from Kuwait, rehired workers newly contracted to return to the same Kuwaiti employer as before, and tourists are exempted from the ban.

In addition to the deployment ban, the Philippine government has offered Filipino workers already in Kuwait to be voluntarily repatriated.

There are around 250,000 Filipinos working in Kuwait, 65 percent of which are domestic helpers, according to the Philippine embassy in 2018.

== Developments ==
=== Kuwaiti government response ===
The Kuwaiti government has criticized the migrant worker ban imposed by the Philippines in gulf country and has stated that all cases of alleged abuse against Filipino migrant workers are being handled by its laws. The National Assembly of Kuwait has discussed the situation of the Filipino migrant workers in the country.

On April 3, 2018, the Kuwait government announced that it aims to recruit more Ethiopians as domestic workers to compensate for deficit in the labor force caused by its diplomatic row with the Philippines.

=== Repatriation of Filipino workers ===
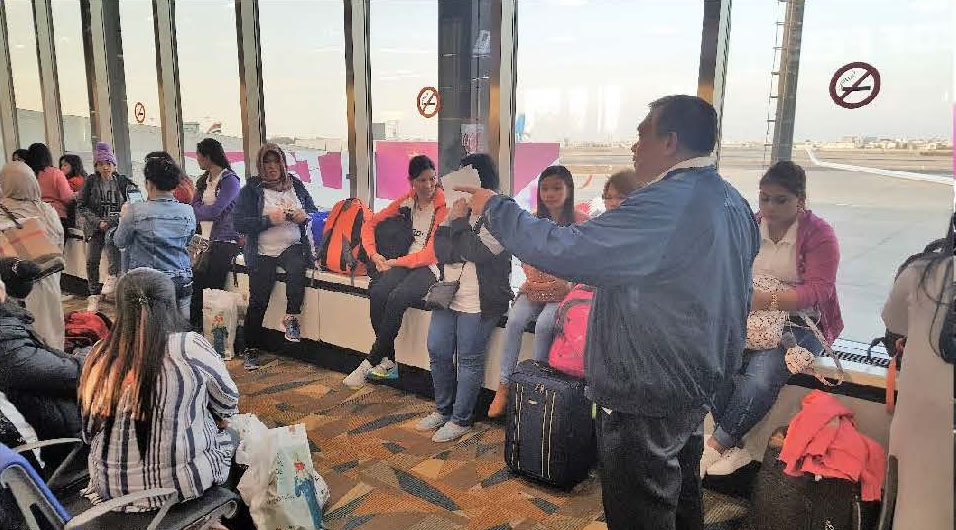
The Philippine Ambassador to Bahrain speaking with Filipino workers from Kuwait who are transiting through the Bahrain International Airport.

By the end of March 2018, 4,000 Filipino workers has been voluntarily repatriated from Kuwait and the Philippine government is negotiating with Kuwait for the repatriation of 6,000 more workers

=== Demafelis murder case ===
Lebanese man Nader Essam Assaf, and his Syrian wife were accused for the killing of Demafelis. With the help of Interpol the two were detained in the Syrian capital of Damascus in February 2018. The Syrian government handed custody of Assaf to Lebanon while Assaf's wife remained in Syria. On April 1, 2018, a Kuwaiti court convicted the couple of murder and sentenced them to death by hanging. They were tried in absentia.

=== April 21 Philippine embassy operation ===
Relations between the two countries became more strained when a video emerged depicting operations of Philippine embassy officials purportedly rescuing Filipino maids from alleged abusive employers. The operation conducted on April 21, 2018, was seen by Kuwait as a "flagrant" violation of its sovereignty. Filipino diplomats in the Philippines insist that the operations were not clandestine. Two embassy staff members were alleged to have encourage Filipino migrant workers to leave their employers.

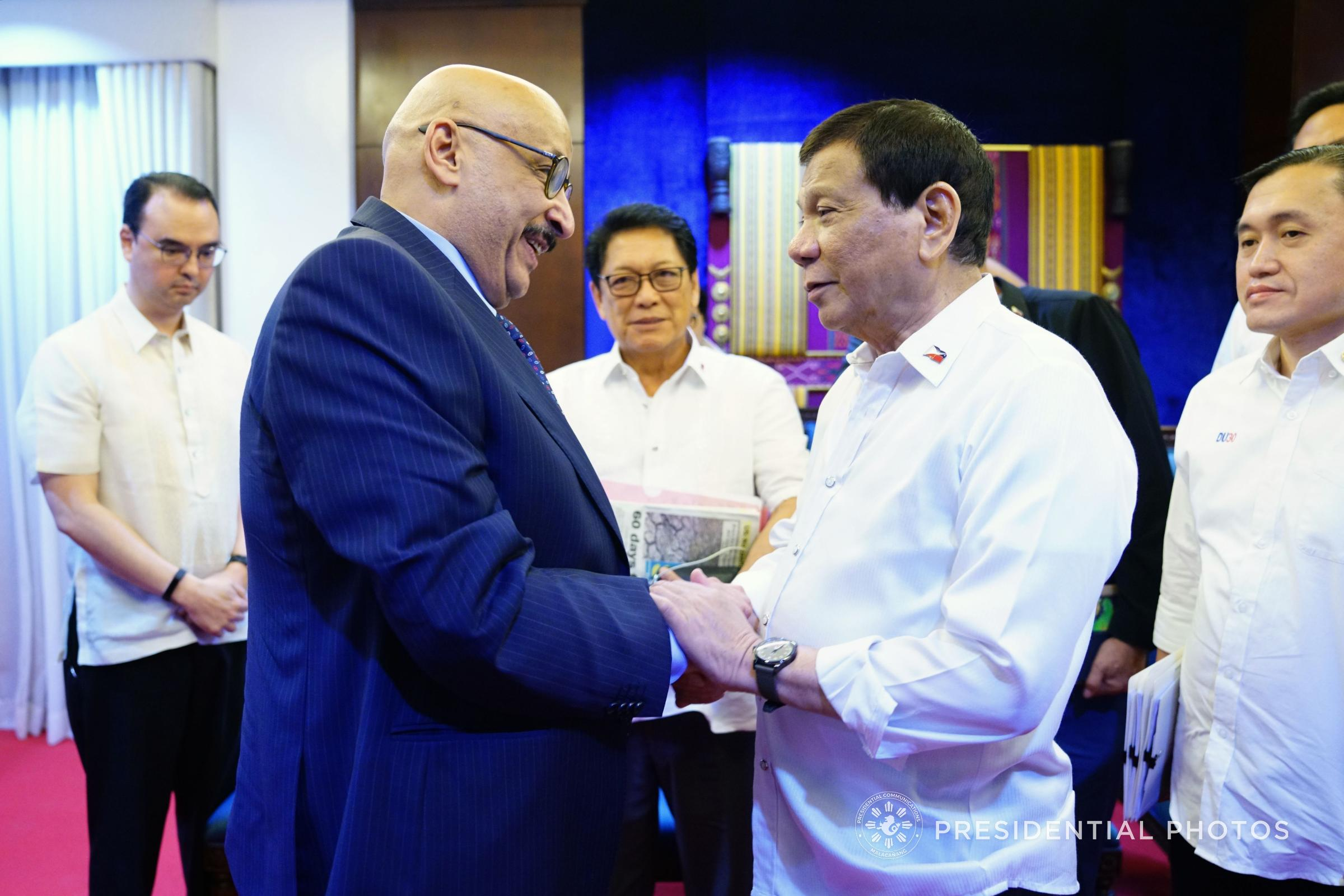
President Duterte and Kuwaiti Ambassador to the Philippines Musaed Saleh Ahmad Althwaikh exchange pleasantries following their meeting at the Presidential Guest House in Davao City on April 23, 2018.

The Philippine government on April 24 apologized for the incident saying it acknowledges Kuwait has its own laws while maintaining that the welfare of Filipino migrant workers are also within its interest. The following day, Kuwait declared Philippine Ambassador Renato Villa persona non grata demanding Villa to leave the gulf country within the week, and recalled its envoy in Manila for consultations. The Philippines called the move "deeply disturbing" and said that Kuwait "reneged" on an earlier agreement to cooperate. Kuwait arrested four drivers and three diplomats involved in the operation and pressed charges against them.

Following a meeting between officials of the two countries, the four drivers involved were released and the charges against them were dropped.

== Agreement ==
=== Negotiations ===
Authorities from both countries have been engaged in talks to defuse diplomatic tensions. On February 14, 2018, the governments of Kuwait and the Philippines announced they come to consensus to sign an agreement on working conditions regulations. Philippine president Rodrigo Duterte has also been invited to make a state visit to Kuwait.

Duterte, on March 6, laid two conditions for the labor deployment ban on Kuwait to be lifted; the signing of a Memorandum of Understanding on labor policies between Kuwait and the Philippines, and that "justice be served" in regards to the death of Joanna Demafelis. On March 16, a draft agreement was accomplished by officials from the two countries and was expected to be signed in Kuwait in two weeks.

Despite Kuwait's action on the Philippine Ambassador and its own envoy in Manila, Philippine Foreign Secretary Alan Peter Cayetano stated on April 25, that the agreement is now planned to be signed in the Philippines and the Kuwait government has followed-up regarding the agreement. Cayetano also encouraged Duterte to accept Kuwait's invitation to make a state visit to the Middle Eastern country.

However, President Rodrigo Duterte shortly declared that the labor deployment ban as "permanent". Duterte also said that the signing of the labor agreement with Kuwait will not push through and that he will not make a visit to the gulf country. Harry Roque, the Philippine presidential spokesperson later contradicted Duterte's statement saying that the ban is not "permanent" and may still be lifted.

=== Signing ===
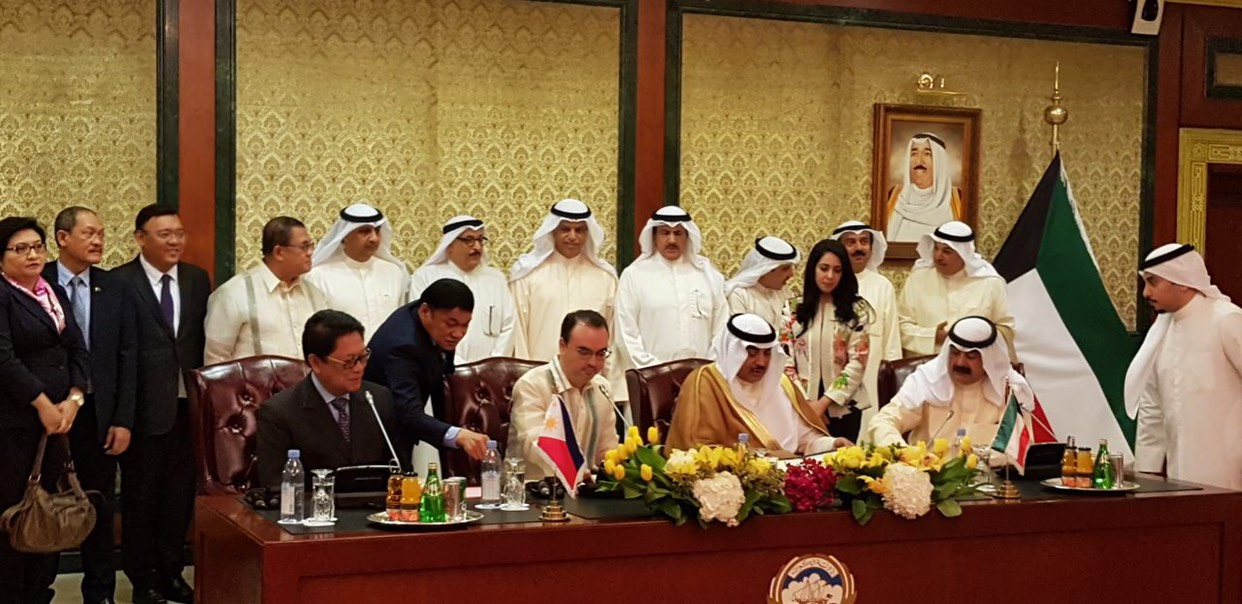
Signing of the "Agreement on the Employment of Domestic Workers" between Kuwait in the Philippines which was led by Kuwaiti Foreign Minister Sabah Al-Khalid Al-Sabah and Philippine Foreign Affairs Secretary Alan Peter Cayetano.

The memorandum of agreement (MoU) entitled "Agreement on the Employment of Domestic Workers" between the Philippines and Kuwait was signed by representatives of Kuwait and the Philippines on May 11, 2018.

The two countries had a consensus on labor matters which covered all migrant domestic workers in Kuwait regardless of their nationality. Under the deal, certain rights of migrant workers were recognized: They can't have their passports and other travel documents kept by their employers; and they have the right to use their mobile phones. Workers are now also entitled to be provided food, housing, clothing, and health insurance by their employers and at least a day off from work each week.

Filipino workers can't be a transferred to another employer without the consent of the worker or approval from the Philippine Overseas Employment Administration (POEA). Contract renewals which used to be automatic now had to be subject to approval of the POEA.

=== Aftermath of the deal signing ===
Philippine Foreign Affairs Secretary Alan Peter Cayetano has announced that a new Philippine Ambassador to Kuwait will be appointed and that he will advised Philippine President Rodrigo Duterte to lift the deployment ban of Filipino workers to Kuwait. Duterte on his part has stated that he is open to lifting the ban following the signing of the deal.

On May 12, 2018, a partial lifting of the ban was announced by the Philippine government allowing the deployment of "skilled" and "semi-skilled" workers to Kuwait and Philippine Presidential spokesperson Harry Roque has stated that relations between the two countries has normalized. Duterte ordered the deployment ban to be fully lifted on May 16 and on May 22 he declared that his country's relation with Kuwait is now "okay".

== See also ==
- Kuwait–Philippines relations, general international relations between the two countries
- Sondos Alqattan, critic of the agreement on migrant domestic workers which ended the diplomatic crisis.
- Death of Jeanelyn Villavende, a Filipino domestic worker in Kuwait in 2019
- Death of Jullebee Ranara, a Filipino domestic worker in Kuwait in 2023
