= Kuwait–Philippines relations =

Kuwait–Philippine relations
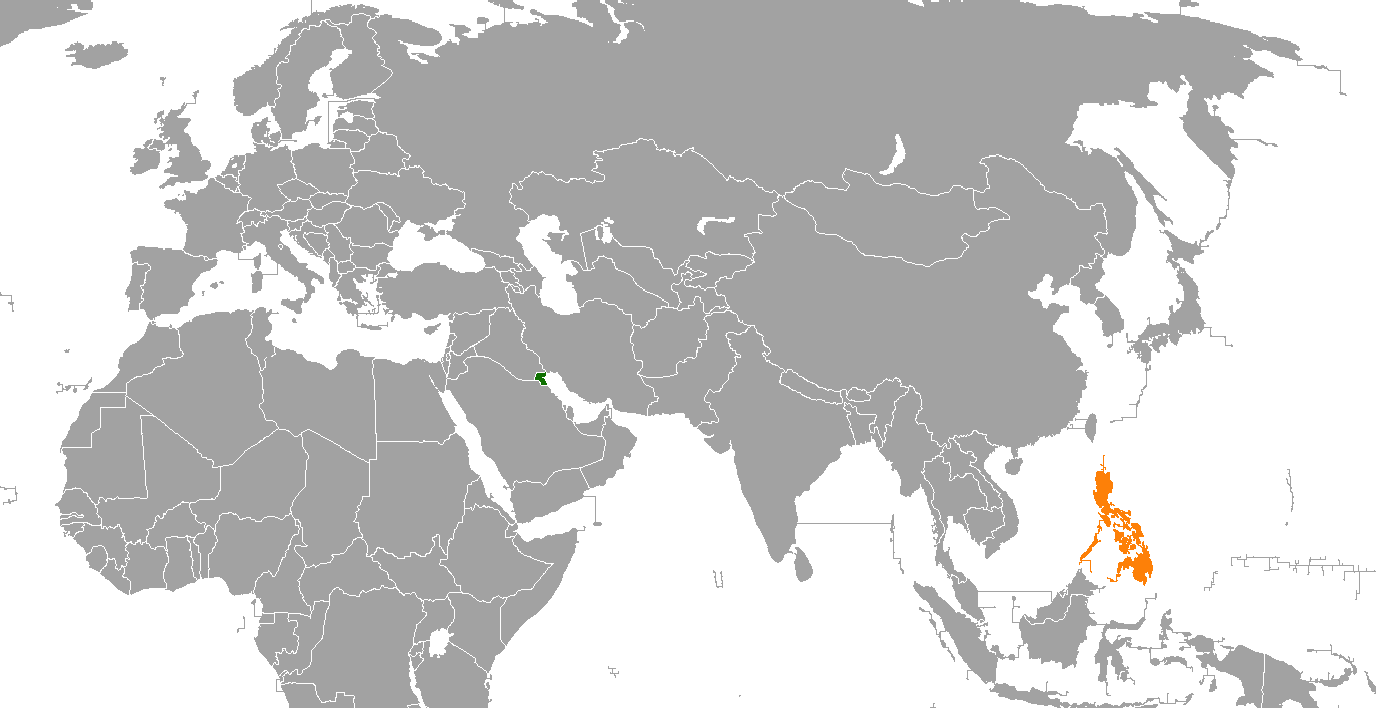

- Kuwait: Philippines

Kuwait–Philippines relations refers to the bilateral ties of Kuwait and the Philippines. Kuwait has an embassy in Manila, while the Philippines has an embassy in Kuwait City.

== History ==
Kuwait was recognized by the Philippines in September 1961, three months after it gained independence. Formal diplomatic relations would be established between the two countries on January 17, 1979. The Philippines established an embassy in Kuwait in 1979.

The Philippines was part of the United States-led coalition to liberate Kuwait from Iraqi control during the Gulf War in 1991. Kuwait then opened an embassy in Manila on May 24, 1996.

== Economic relations ==
=== Trade ===
Trade between Kuwait and the Philippines amounted to $779 million in 2015 with the balance of trade favoring Kuwait. Kuwaiti investments in the Philippines are primarily agricultural in nature. In 1981, a bid by Philippine firms to build a $300 million highway to connect Kuwait to Baghdad, Iraq was highly publicized.

=== Labor ===
Around 250 thousand Filipinos, 65 percent of which are domestic helpers, works in Kuwait according to the Philippine embassy in 2018. Domestic workers from the Philippines along with migrants from Sri Lanka and India began to settle in Kuwait in the 1970s. Reports of humans rights abuses against migrant workers in Kuwait including Filipinos remains a concern of the Philippines.

Alleged cases of abuse and rape has led to Filipinos making a petition to their government to ban the deployment of domestic help to Kuwait in 2013. The petition has collected at least 10 thousand signatures.

== Controversies ==
=== 2018 diplomatic crisis ===
President Rodrigo Duterte issued a ban on deployment of Filipino workers to Kuwait in February 2018 following a series of deaths of Filipino domestic workers. The incident that led to the ban reportedly was when the corpse of a Filipino domestic worker was discovered in a freezer inside a warehouse that had been abandoned since November 2016.

In April 2018, a video showed purported action by Philippine embassy officials rescuing Filipino maids from allegedly abusive employers. Kuwait protested that the action challenged their sovereignty. In May 2018, an agreement was signed pledging greater rights for Filipino migrant workers; the deployment ban was eventually lifted.

=== OFW deaths ===
On December 31, 2019, a 26-year-old Overseas Filipino Worker named Jeanelyn Padernal Villavende was killed by the employer's wife, according to the Department of Foreign Affairs (DFA). The DFA condemned the death of the woman, "calling it a violation of the agreement signed by the Philippine and Kuwaiti governments in 2018 for their protection." An autopsy was conducted by the National Bureau of Investigation (NBI) revealed that the woman was sexually abused prior to her death. A year later, a Kuwaiti Criminal Court sentenced an employer to death, according to Foreign Affairs Secretary Teodoro Locsin Jr.

On January 21, 2023, 34-year-old (Note: Some sources stated her age as 35-year-old. On a tarpaulin display, Ranara was born on July 17, 1988 and killed on January 21, 2023, thus she died at the age of 34.) domestic helper Jullebee Cabilis Ranara was murdered and her burnt body was found in a middle of the desert. According to the reports by Arab Times, an autopsy showed that Ranara was pregnant. A 17-year-old man, a son of Ranara's employer, allegedly raped her before he killed her. He was later arrested. The Department of Migrant Workers (DMW) condemned the killing of the OFW and also said that they would not issue a deployment ban. Her remains was repatriated in the Philippines on the night of January 27, 2023. The next day, per family's request, the NBI conducted the autopsy on her remains. Her funeral was held in her home in Las Piñas, and was interred on February 5.

In February, the Philippines announced that it was once again suspending the deployment of first-time Filipino household workers to Kuwait. On 10 May 2023, the State of Kuwait announced that they were suspending visa privileges of Filipino nationals and that no new visas would be issued for Filipino citizens. This suspension of visa issuance and privileges was lifted in June 2024.

== Resident diplomatic missions ==
- Kuwait has an embassy in Manila.
- the Philippines has an embassy in Kuwait City.

== See also ==
- Foreign relations of Kuwait
- Foreign relations of the Philippines
