= Slavery in Qatar =

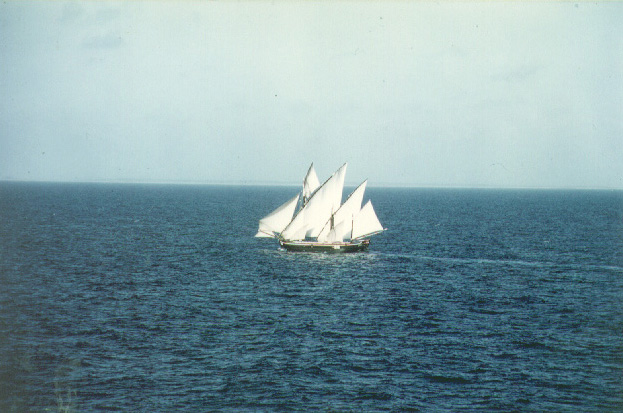
Dhows were used to transport goods and slaves.

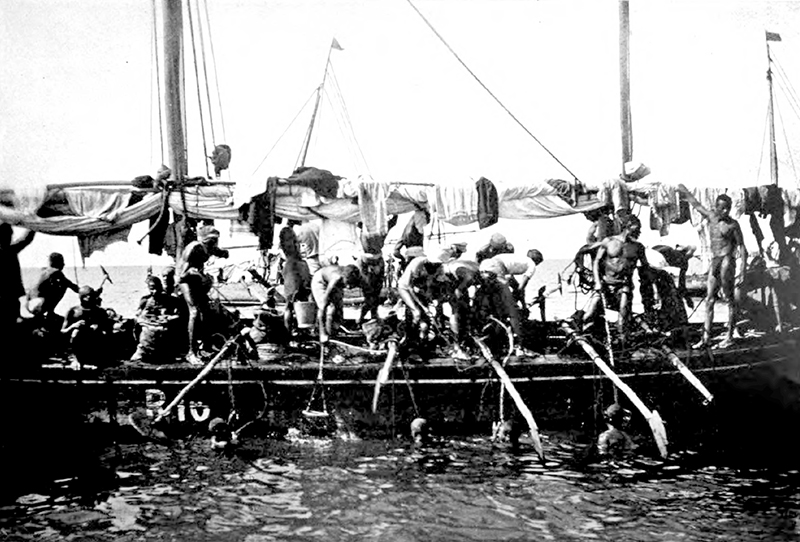
Pearl divers in the Persian Gulf. At the time, the pearl industry was dominated by slave labor.

For most of its history, Qatar practiced slavery until its abolition in 1952. Many members of the Afro-Arabian minority are descendants of the former slaves. Chattel slavery was succeeded by the Kafala system. The Qatari government officially announced that the kafala system has been abolished in Qatar in December 2016, but as of 2026 both Human Rights Watch and Amnesty International have found that foreign labourers in Qatar continue to face widespread abuses under a "restrictive" and "exploitative" Kafala system.

== History ==
=== Slave trade ===
==== Omani route ====
During the Omani Empire (1692–1856), Oman was a center of the Zanzibar slave trade. Slaves were trafficked from the Swahili coast of East Africa via Zanzibar to Oman. From Oman, the slaves were exported to the rest of the Arabian Peninsula and Persia, including the Trucial States, Qatar, Bahrain and Kuwait. Oman's optimal location between the Arabian Sea and the Gulf region positioned it as a key player in the Zanzibar slave trade. Serving as a pivotal navigation point, Oman gained significant importance in the history of the Arabian Gulf region. The economic impact of the slave trade persisted, becoming a substantial factor in shaping Oman's economy in the post-slave trade era.

The Omani slave trade from Africa started to shrink in the late 19th century.

==== Hajj route ====
A second route of slave trade existed, with people from both Africa and East Asia, who were smuggled to Jeddah in the Arabian Peninsula in connection to the Muslim pilgrimage, Hajj, to Mecca and Medina. Victims were tricked to perform the journey willingly in the belief that they were going on the Hajj pilgrimage, or employed as servants, and then sold upon arrival. These slaves were then exported from the Hejaz to Oman, the Trucial States, Qatar, Bahrain and Kuwait.

==== Balochistan route ====
In the 1940s, a third slave trade route was recorded, through which individuals from the Balochistan region were transported across the Persian Gulf, with many selling themselves or their children to escape severe poverty. In 1943, reports indicated that young women from this region were shipped via Oman and the Trucial States to Mecca, where they were sold as concubines for $350–450 following the decline in the availability of Caucasian women.

=== Function and conditions ===
Slavery was practiced by the House of Thani and the wealthy merchants, but also by ordinary villagers, who could own only one or two slaves.

==== Female slaves ====
Female slaves were primarily used as either domestic servants, or as concubines (sex slaves). The PDQ Oil Company had 250 slave laborers during its first year of production in Qatar in 1949.

Black African women were primarily used as domestic house slaves rather than exclusively for sexual services, while white Caucasian women (normally Circassian or Georgian) were preferred as concubines (sex slaves), and when the main slave route of white slave girls was reduced after Russia's conquest of the Caucasus and Central Asia in the mid 19th-century (reducing the Black Sea slave trade and the Kazakh Khanate slave trade), Balochistan and "Red" Ethiopian (Oromo and Sidamo) women became the preferred targets for sexual slavery. Non-African female slaves were sold in the Persian Gulf where they were bought for marriage; these were fewer and often Armenian, Georgian, or from Baluchistan and India.

Female slaves were often used for sexual services as concubines for a period of time, and then sold or married off to other slaves; the slave owners would arranged both marriages and divorce for their slaves, and the offspring of two slaves would become slaves in turn. It was common for slave owners to claim sexual services of married female slaves when the slave husband was away for long periods of time, to hunt for pearls or fish or similar labor, and sexual abuse was a common reason given when female slaves applied for manumission at the British Agency.

==== Male slaves ====
During the flourishing period of the late seventeenth to early eighteenth century, male slaves played a pivotal role in the burgeoning pearl industry of Qatar, particularly as pearl divers. The thriving pearl diving sector not only led to the establishment of coastal settlements but also triggered significant migration to Qatar. Subsequently, the nation witnessed a substantial economic upturn attributed to the prosperity of the pearl fishing industry. This economic boom facilitated Qatar's integration into the global economy and marked the initiation of globalization in the region. Predominantly of African descent, these slaves, constituting approximately a quarter to a third of Qatar's population, were prominently engaged in the cultivation and exploitation of pearls and used in a number of other tasks: as soldiers, farm labourers, cash crop workers, maritime sailors, dock workers, porters, irrigation canal workers, fishermen, and domestic servants.

It was common for Arab men to use the sexual services of enslaved African women, but a male African slave who had sexual relations with a local "pure blood" Arab woman would be executed to preserve tribal honor and social status, regardless if the couple had married or not.

== Activism against slave trade ==
The British Empire gained control of Qatar in the 1890s and signed the 1926 Slavery Convention to fight enslavement in all land under their control. However, they doubted their ability to stop Qataris from continuing slavery, so the British policy was therefore to assure the League of Nations that Qatar followed the same anti-slavery treaties signed by the British and prevent observation of the area that could disprove the claims. In the 1940s, there were several suggestions made by the British to combat the slave trade and the slavery in the region, but none was considered enforceable on the Qataris.

=== Manumission ===
According to British policy, if a slave escaped and applied for manumission in one of its Political Agencies, they were eligible to receive a manumission certificate. Granting such certificates also served as a non-recognition of the legitimacy of slavery by the British government. As the British have not established a Political Agency in Qatar until 1949, slaves seeking manumission were compelled to escape and often travel to Bahrain to apply for a certificate. Archived files from the India Office contain hundreds of slave manumission statements, which were typically generated following an interview process conducted by the staff at the relevant Political Agency.

The number of female slaves in the Gulf was as high or higher than that of male slaves, but the number of female slaves who made applications for manumission at the British Agencies in the Gulf was significantly lower (only 280 of 950 documented cases in 1921–1946), likely because in the Islamic society of the Gulf, where women were excluded from wage labour and public life, it was impossible for a freedwoman to survive without a male protector.

Common characteristics of slavery included the kidnapping of young boys by slave traffickers from regions such as Baluchistan, Yemen, Oman, or Africa, who were typically forced into indentured servitude in the pearling industry. Women, conversely, were often subjected to domestic servitude. Prominent reasons for seeking manumission encompassed experiences of violence, abuse, imprisonment, mistreatment, inadequate food and clothing, and the desire to reunite with family or avoid separation from them.

Some of the archived manumission statements:

Sa'id bin Husain:

My parents were free persons living at Madina (Hedjaz). I was kidnapped from them when I was about 10 years old. I was brought by land to Kuwait, where I was sold to Salih Sulaiman al-Mana' of Qatar. My latter master brought me to Qatar and ever since I have been in his service. During summer I go to diving and in winter I work in the household. He used to give me very little money for my expenses. In the beginning he was treating me nicely and lately his treatment has been very bad, which fact has led me to run away. I, my wife Hasinah bint Marzook, and my son Abdur-Razzak walked from Dohah to the northern shore of Qatar where we joined a sailing boat as passengers for Bahrain. Now we have come to the Agency applying to be granted with manumission certificates.

Statement of Almas bin Muhammad:

I was born at Mekran. When I was a small boy I went with my family to Dubai where we lived. About 5 years ago, while I was walking from Dubai to Sharjah, I was kidnapped by certain bedouins who took me to Buraimi and sold me to one Abdullah bin Ghurab. After a short period, Abdullah brought me to Qatar and sold me to my present master Saad bin Majid of Wakra in whose service I have been since then. My master used to send me out diving and take over my earnings. In other times I used to perform odd jobs for him. He was not giving me good treatment. He arrived recently with his family from Qatar and brought me along with. I seized the opportunity of my presence in Bahrain and came to the Agency praying that I may be manumitted. My master is staying at Halat Bu Mahir.

Mubarak Bin Rozah:

My name is Mubarak bin Rozah. I am relating my name to my mother's because I do not know the name of my father nor the country from which I was brought to Qatar. I also do not know whether I was a born slave from slave parents or from free parents. I was too small, when I was brought to Qatar by the Bedouins, to recognize them. They sold me to one Sa'ad bin Husain, a Qatar subject. He died and I was transferred to his daughter Fatmah, who also died ... My master sold my wife and daughter to Sultan Walad Towar, who took my wife to Riyadh and sold her there. My daughter died at Qatar. I have been much ill-treated by this master and I have no intention to return to Qatar. I pray that I may be freed and allowed to remain at Bahrain. If I go back to Qatar, I will again be put into slavery, which I no longer like.

Zalikah bint Jumah:

I am a born slave. My father Jumah was originally in Bahrain, and when he was a young boy, he was taken to Qatar and sold to Ali bin Qasim al-Thani, brother of the present Ruler of Qatar. My mother was a slave of one at Wakrah (Qatar). She was also purchased by the above Ali. My parents are still alive at Ummul-Silal (Qatar). I have three brothers and three sisters, who are now at Ummul-Silal. About one week ago, Nalleh bint Ahmed wife of the above Ali has come to Bahrain for treatment in the Mission Hospital. I came in her company. When I was at their house in Qatar, they always maltreat me, and I complain to the Ruler of Qatar, but he returns me to them. Yesterday Nalleh bint Ahmed accused me of some theft, and beaten me. They tied me up with a rope yesterday and last evening. This morning they release me, and as I am in Bahrain I escaped and I have come to the Agency applying for manumission.

=== Abolition ===
After World War II, there was a growing international pressure from the United Nations to end the slave trade. In 1948, the United Nations declared slavery to be a crime against humanity in the Universal Declaration of Human Rights, after which the Anti-Slavery Society pointed out that there were about one million slaves in the Arabian Peninsula, which was a crime against the 1926 Slavery Convention, and demanded that the UN form a committee to handle the issue. The UN formed the Ad Hoc Committee on Slavery in 1950, which resulted in the introduction of the Supplementary Convention on the Abolition of Slavery. The Ad Hoc Committee on Slavery filed a report on the chattel slavery in Qatar during the 1950-1951 investigation.

Slavery was finally abolished by the ruler of Qatar after British pressure in March 1952. The Qatari government reimbursed former slave owners financially and Sheikh Ali bin Abdullah Al Thani personally contributed with 25 percent of the compensation money. By May 1952, manumission money had been paid for 660 slaves, the average compensation sum being 1,500 rupees, but for some, such as one slave girl, as much as 2,000 rupees; the compensation has been referred to as the first big distribution of wealth in Qatar. The former slaves in Qatar became citizens after manumission. Many members of the Afro-Arabian minority are descendants of the former slaves.

In 1957, the British pressured the Gulf rulers to accept the 1956 Supplementary Slavery Convention in accordance with the Colonial Application; this was accepted by Kuwait, Qatar and Bahrain, but the rulers of the Trucial Coast stated that such a law could not be enforced.

However, slaves are mentioned in Qatar after the official abolition of 1952. Sheiks of Qatar are recorded to have included slaves in their retinues when attending the Coronation of Queen Elizabeth II in London in 1953, as well as during their visit in Britain in 1958.

Many members of the Afro-Arabian minority are descendants of the former slaves, a notable example being Fatma Shaddad.

After the abolition of slavery, poor migrant workers were employed under the Kafala system, which have been compared to slavery. In August 2020 Qatar abolished the Kafala system and introduced labor reforms. Under these reforms workers can change jobs without employer's permission and are now paid a basic minimum wage regardless of their nationality. The basic minimum wage is set at 1,000 QAR. Allowances for food and accommodation must be provided by employers, which are 300 QAR and 500 QAR respectively. Qatar introduced a wage protection system to ensure the employers are complying with the reforms. The wage protection system monitors the workers in the private sector. This new system has reduced wage abuses and disputes among migrant labours.

=== Memorial ===
In 2015, a museum about the slavery in Qatar was opened by the government in the Bin Jelmood house in Doha, which has been described as the first museum focused on slavery in the Arab world. The Bin Jelmood Museum of the Msheireb Museums stands as a heritage residence dedicated to the examination and exploration of the historical subject of slavery in Qatar, delving into the broader history of the region. Viewed through the perspective of certain elder Qatari individuals, this museum is regarded as sensitive due to the relatively recent abolition of slavery. Many of the visitors sensitive to this place are individuals who lived through the corresponding historical era.

== Modern slavery ==
=== The Kafala system ===
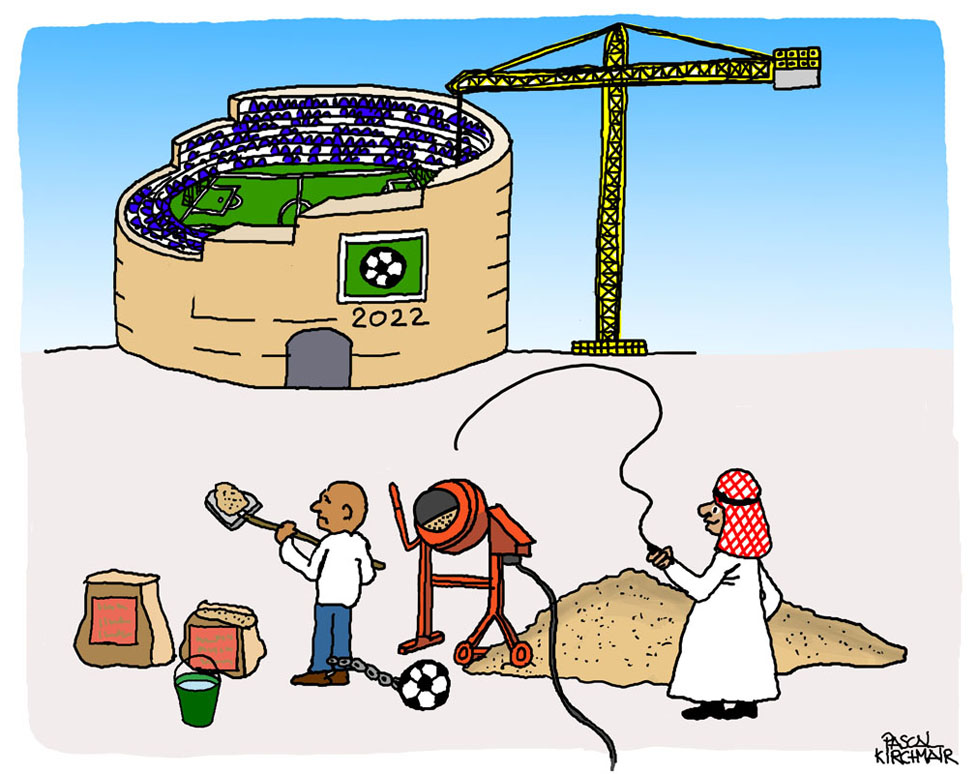
A political cartoon depicting slave labour in the construction of the stadiums in Qatar ahead of the 2022 FIFA World Cup (see also: 2022 FIFA World Cup controversies)

Qatar officially announced the abolition of the sponsorship system (Kafala) on December 12, 2016, but as of 2026 both Human Rights Watch and Amnesty International have found that foreign labourers in Qatar continue to face widespread abuses under a "restrictive" and "exploitative" Kafala system.

=== Unsolved problem ===
Officially, slavery in Qatar was abolished in the middle of the 20th century, but the conditions in which many workers who prepared the country for the FIFA World Cup lived and worked look almost like slavery. It was for long necessary for a migrant worker in Qatar to obtain an employer's permission to change the company worked for; this restriction was abolished in 2020. In addition, a worker cannot leave the country without permission from their employer.

In some ways, it all resembles slavery, even at the official level, only with more correct formulations.

According to the Global Slavery Index (created by the Walk Free Foundation, an international group of experts on combating slavery and human trafficking with the assistance of the Gallup research company), it estimates there are more than 30 thousand people in modern slavery in Qatar, with an estimated 6.8 out of 1,000 people enslaved, ranking #60 most slaves in per capita numbers, and with one of the highest ratios of slavery prevalence per GDP per capita.

In 2016, Qatar officially announced the abolition of kafala, but as of 2026 both Human Rights Watch and Amnesty International have found that foreign labourers in Qatar continue to face widespread abuses under a "restrictive" and "exploitative" Kafala system.

=== Stadium construction ===
Qatar received the right to host the FIFA World Cup in December 2010. And already in 2012, the International Trade Union Confederation (ITUC) began receiving complaints from workers employed in the construction of facilities. By the beginning of 2013, the number of applications exceeded several thousand, after which MCP appealed to the Ministry of Labor of Qatar with a demand to deal with six contractors.

In its appeal, the Confederation of Trade Unions emphasized four types of violations: the nature of work does not correspond to what is provided for in the labor agreement; employers do not fulfill their obligations to pay wages; employers withdraw passports from employees; employees are forced to live in overcrowded labor camps and are deprived of the right to form trade unions.

In response to these accusations, the Qatari authorities promised to increase the number of inspectors at the 2022 World Cup facilities by 25% (their number was supposed to exceed 300 people), and the then president of the International Football Federation (FIFA) Sepp Blatter said that the situation with labor rights will be discussed at a meeting of the executive committee of the organization in early October 2013.

Approximately 100 days after the 2022 FIFA World Cup in Qatar came to an end, a significant number of construction workers involved in the stadium construction found themselves unemployed, impoverished, and struggling to meet basic needs. Aboubacar, a construction worker in Qatar who anticipated a more promising legacy for his future, lamented a dire situation wherein he had gone without food for two days and remained unsuccessful in securing employment post the World Cup event. Qatar has garnered substantial criticism for the harsh conditions endured by numerous low-wage workers, encompassing issues such as wage deprivation, illicit recruitment fees, and instances of injury and fatality during the construction of stadiums and infrastructure. In response to these infractions, Qatar implemented substantial labor reforms, enabling migrant workers to switch jobs without requiring employer consent and establishing an elevated and unbiased minimum wage.

For the first time, The Guardian newspaper reported not just about rights violations, but also about deaths on construction sites for the World Cup in February 2014. The article claimed that in three years out of 2 million migrant workers, up to 4,000 workers could die from unbearable conditions and insecurity. The publication also reported which workers from which countries most often stay to work in Qatar—for example, immigrants from India make up 22% of the total number of people employed at the World Cup facilities, a similar share falls on Pakistan. About 16% of the workers are from Nepal, 13% from Iran, 11% from the Philippines, 8% from Egypt and 8% from Sri Lanka.

== See also ==
- Human trafficking in Qatar
- Kafala system
- Human rights in Qatar § Slavery
- History of slavery in the Muslim world
- History of concubinage in the Muslim world
- Human trafficking in the Middle East
