= Death of Jeanelyn Villavende =

2023 death of a Filipino worker in Kuwait

- Date: December 28, 2019
- Location: Kuwait
- Perpetrators: Undisclosed; female and male (Villavende's employers)
- Deaths: 1 (Jeanelyn Villavende)
- Convicted: 2
- Sentence: Female employer (death); Male employer (4 years imprisonment)

The death of Jeanelyn Villavende, an Overseas Filipino Worker in Kuwait, was established to have occurred in late December 2019. Like the death of Joanna Demafelis in 2018, the incident caused a rift in Kuwait-Philippines relations.

She was found to have been killed on December 28, 2019, by her employer, who was sentenced to death almost a year after.

== Background ==
=== Prior diplomatic crisis ===
The Philippine Department of Foreign Affairs (DFA) issued a statement on December 30, 2019, condemned the killing of Filipino domestic worker in Kuwait. This followed the death of another worker Joanna Demafelis which started a diplomatic crisis in 2018 between Kuwait and the Philippines which ended in a labor agreement.

=== Victim ===
Jeanelyn Villavenda
- Died: December 28, 2019 (aged 26)
- Resting place: Norala, South Cotabato
- Occupation: Domestic worker

The Philippine Department of Labor and Employment identified the killed worker as Jeanelyn Padernal Villavende on the following day. Aged 26, she was from Norala, South Cotabato.

Villavende's family last established contact with Jeanelyn in October 2019. They attempted to call her on December 13, 2019, but a female employer answered their call and claimed Jeanelyn was busy.

She was also found to have already been complaining about her employer's alleged underpayment as early as September 2019. She was locked in her room. She was brought to the hospital by her male employer, however she was reportedly dead already and was "black and blue".

Autopsy reports concluded Villavende died on December 28, 2019, from "acute failure of heart and respiration as a result of shock and multiple injuries in the vascular nervous system" and that she sustained repeated beatings and rape.

=== Perpetrator ===
The perpetrator was Villavende's female employer. Her husband, and also an employer of Villavende, was a ranking government official of Kuwait.

== Response ==
Philippine foreign secretary Teodoro Locsin Jr. called for justice and demanded the head of Villavende's killer. Likewise the Philippine Department of Labor and Employment led by secretary Silvestre Bello III condemned the killing.

On January 2, 2020, the Philippines imposed a partial deployment ban on migrant workers to Kuwait, barring first-time prospective domestic workers. This was upgraded to a complete ban on January 15, after the results of an autopsy conducted on Villavende's body was released. The ban was lifted on February 14 after charges were filed.

Kuwait has allowed the Philippines to join its own investigation on the death. The two countries also agreed to engage on talks regarding the implementation of the 2018 labor deal signed between the two countries.

According to Villavende's father, the employers' side attempted to convince the Villavende from pursuing a criminal case against them with ₱59 million-worth of blood money. The offer was rejected.

== Aftermath ==
Criminal charges were filed against Villavende's employers and tried under Kuwait's sharia law. On December 30, 2020, the Kuwaiti Court of First Instance issued the verdict. Her female employer was sentenced to death for assaulting and locking the victim in a room. Her husband on the other hand was given the sentence of four years of imprisonment for not reporting the crime.

== See also ==
- Death of Jullebee Ranara
