= Human trafficking in Sri Lanka =

Sri Lanka is a source and destination country for men and women trafficked for the purposes of involuntary servitude and commercial sexual exploitation. Sri Lankan men and women migrate willingly to Kuwait, Jordan, Saudi Arabia, Qatar, Lebanon, the United Arab Emirates, Singapore, Hong Kong, Malaysia, and South Korea to work as construction workers, domestic servants, or garment factory workers. However, some find themselves in situations of involuntary servitude when faced with restrictions on movement, withholding of passports, threats, physical or sexual abuse, and debt bondage that is, in some instances, facilitated by large pre-departure fees imposed by recruitment agents. Children are trafficked internally for commercial sexual exploitation and, less frequently, for forced labor. The designated Foreign Terrorist Organization Liberation Tigers of Tamil Eelam (LTTE) continued to recruit, sometimes forcibly, children for use as soldiers in areas outside the Sri Lankan government’s control. Government security forces may also be complicit in letting a pro-government paramilitary organization recruit, sometimes forcibly, child soldiers. Reports also indicate that a small number of women from Thailand, China, Russia, and other countries of the Newly Independent States are trafficked into Sri Lanka for commercial sexual exploitation. In November 2007, over 100 Sri Lankan peacekeeping soldiers were repatriated based on accusations that they engaged in sexual misconduct, some cases involving minors, in Haiti. The Government of Sri Lanka does not fully comply with the minimum standards for the elimination of trafficking; however, it is making significant efforts to do so. Sri Lanka is placed on Tier 2 Watch List for failing to provide evidence of increasing efforts to combat severe forms of trafficking in persons over the previous year, particularly in the area of law enforcement.

The government failed to arrest, prosecute, or convict any person for trafficking offenses and continued to punish some victims of trafficking for crimes committed as a result of being trafficked. At the same time, Sri Lanka protected some victims of trafficking, including Sri Lankan nationals trafficked abroad. The government appointed a focal point on trafficking in persons in July, who convenes a monthly anti-trafficking working group to develop and coordinate anti-trafficking policy.

U.S. State Department's Office to Monitor and Combat Trafficking in Persons placed the country in "Tier 2" in 2017.

== Prosecution ==
Sri Lanka made little progress on its law enforcement efforts this reporting period. The Sri Lankan government prohibits all forms of trafficking through an April 2006 amendment to its penal code. Trafficking offenses are punishable by up to 20 years’ imprisonment; these penalties are commensurate with those assigned for other grave crimes. While the government took administrative action against 350 labor recruiters engaging in fraudulent recruitment practices, it did not criminally prosecute, convict, or sentence recruiters for practices that amounted to trafficking. The government initiated one investigation of a recruitment agent involved in a case where three females were to be trafficked to Saudi Arabia as domestic servants. Sri Lanka similarly failed to report any prosecutions or convictions for trafficking for commercial sexual exploitation, including trafficking of children. Sri Lanka, in cooperation with the United Nations, launched an investigation into allegations of the complicity in sexual misconduct of Sri Lankan peacekeepers in Haiti, including sexual exploitation of minors. The government investigated 47 cases of child abduction for forced labor as child soldiers, resulting in 37 being returned home. No arrests, prosecutions, or convictions were made in relation to these cases, however. There were no public officials arrested for facilitating trafficking, nor were there substantiated reports that any officials were involved in trafficking.

== Protection ==
The Sri Lankan government’s efforts to provide protection for trafficking victims improved nominally, but remained limited. The government did not provide foreign trafficking victims with legal alternatives to their removal to countries where they would suffer retribution or hardship. Sri Lanka also failed to ensure that victims of trafficking were not punished for acts committed as a result of being trafficked. Of particular concern are ongoing reports that women arrested on suspicion of being trafficked into Sri Lanka for the purpose of sexual exploitation were asked to pay fines in exchange for release from prison and were usually deported thereafter. Law enforcement officers continue to lack a formal system to identify potential victims of trafficking. The government does not provide specialized training for victim identification, though law enforcement officers participated in NGO-provided training.

For Sri Lankan victims, the government relies primarily on NGOs to provide victim protection services due to resource constraints. Police encourage these victims to assist in investigations against their traffickers, but do not undertake any specific measures to ensure victim or witness safety. For Sri Lankan victims trafficked overseas, the government operates shelters in diplomatic missions, offers repatriation assistance, and provides compensation to some who have registered with the government before leaving. In early 2008, the government paid for the repatriation of over 200 Sri Lankan domestic workers from safe houses in the Middle East. For repatriated Sri Lankan victims, however, there is little government effort to investigate the crimes committed against them. Limited aid is offered in terms of shelter, counseling, and medical care upon return. The government opened two temporary shelters for women who are victims of violence, and these were made available to trafficking victims. The government established an inter-ministerial committee to address the issue of child soldiers. Sri Lanka provides two rehabilitation centers specifically for children conscripted as soldiers; since their establishment in 2005, the rehabilitation centers have assisted 52 children.

== Prevention ==
Sri Lanka made modest efforts to prevent trafficking in persons during the reporting period. In August 2007, the Bureau of Foreign Employment (BFE) began requiring that all overseas employment contracts be signed in the presence a BFE official to ensure that migrant workers understand the contracts’ terms. The government conducted 26 awareness campaigns on child sexual exploitation among teachers, students, hotel staff, taxi and rikshaw drivers, and others employed in the tourism industry. In February 2008, the government established a hotline for complaints about child labor, sexual exploitation, and other abuses. Sri Lanka has not ratified the 2000 UN TIP Protocol.

== See also ==
- Yiohan, a ship involved in trafficking Sri Lankans in 1998.
