= Sondos Alqattan =

Kuwaiti beauty blogger and Instagram user

Sondos Alqattan (Arabic: سندس القطان) is a Kuwaiti beauty blogger and Internet celebrity who rose to international prominence after posting a video critical of a Kuwaiti government move to provide better protection and working conditions for migrant domestic workers.

With some 2.4 million followers on Instagram, Alqattan was a popular 'social media influencer' in the Middle East and used by a number of beauty brands to promote their products. Although a number of brands were fast to desert her, media coverage and online attention about the controversy has since died down. Her popularity has bounced back, and she is once again attracting a growing audience – albeit with comments on her accounts disabled.

== Video on domestic workers ==
In the video, originally posted in Arabic on July 10, 2018, Alqattan questioned the government move to protect workers: "The new laws that have been passed are like a pathetic film," CNN quotes her as saying. "For her to take a day off every week, that's four days a month. Those are the days that she'll be out. And we don't know what she'll be doing on those days, with her passport on her." The Guardian quoted the post, "How can you have a servant at home who gets to keep their passport with them? If they ran away and went back to their country, who'll refund me? I don't want a Filipino maid anymore."

The new regulations, introduced as a result of an agreement signed between the governments of Kuwait and the Philippines, allow maids a weekly day off, the right to retain their passports rather than have the documents held by their employers (their 'sponsors') and the right to transfer their visas to another employer. Kuwaiti law also mandates a maid will work 12 hours a day, with a one-hour break, be provided a personal mobile phone with internet connection and be given an annual holiday of 22 days. Employers pay a $2,000 deposit against the maid's visa, as well as government registration fees of some $2,000.

The new agreement was the direct result of an incident in which a Filipina maid working in Kuwait, Joanna Demafelis, was killed and her mutilated body stored in a freezer for a year. The maid's employer, a Lebanese man, was sentenced to death in April 2018 for her murder. The incident prompted Philippine president, Rodrigo Duterte, to order workers in Kuwait to return to their home country and ban the deployment of new workers to the country. Some 250,000 Filipinos live and work in Kuwait.

=== Reaction ===
Alqattan's original video prompted an international outcry and extensive media coverage.

In response, Alqattan posted an unapologetic statement to Instagram, which intensified criticism. In further comments made to news agency AFP, she stated that the outcry was "unjustified" and did not require an apology. Her original video has since been deleted, although copies remain posted on YouTube. She has been quoted as saying the backlash against her is a "foreign media campaign" against her and "an attack on Islam, the Hijab and Kuwait".

Following the backlash, a number of beauty brands disavowed her comments and announced they would no longer work with her, including Max Factor, Shiseido, Phyto, MAC Cosmetics, M. Micallef and Chelsea Beautique.

However, it appears she remains an active force in Middle Eastern online media, reputedly with Christian Dior. Repeated calls from media to Dior to enquire about its association with Alqattan have been ignored. In a subsequent statement, Christian Dior clarified that it does not have a business relationship with Al Qattan and stated that she attended their fashion show strictly in a private capacity.

== See also ==
- 2018 Kuwait–Philippine diplomatic crisis, former diplomatic tensions between Kuwait and the Philippines which resulted in new Kuwaiti laws regarding the treatment of Filipino workers.
- Ascia AKF
