= Murder of Jullebee Ranara =

2023 death of a Filipino worker in Kuwait

- Date: January 21, 2023
- Location: Al-Salmi Road, Kuwait
- Type: Killing
- Motive: Unknown
- Deaths: 1 (Jullebee Ranara)
- Convicted: Turki Ayed Al-Azmi
- Convictions: Murder; driving without license
- Sentence: 15 years of imprisonment (murder); 1 year of imprisonment (driving without a license)

Jullebee Cabilis Ranara (July 17, 1988 – January 21, 2023) (Note: Some sources stated her age as 35-year-old. On a tarpaulin display, Ranara was born on July 17, 1988 and killed on January 21, 2023, thus she died at the age of 34.) was an Overseas Filipino Worker who was found dead in the desert on January 21, 2023, in Kuwait. She was reportedly raped, murdered, burnt and thrown in the desert. The death revived public discourse on the plight of Filipino migrant workers living in Kuwait.

== Background ==
=== Jullebee Ranara ===
Jullebee Ranara
- Born: Jullebee Cabilis Ranara; July 17, 1988
- Died: January 21, 2023 (aged 34); Al-Salmi Desert, Kuwait
- Resting place: Las Piñas, Philippines
- Occupation: Domestic worker

Jullebee Cabilis Ranara was a 34-year-old woman and an Overseas Filipino Worker (OFW) who was serving as a domestic worker for her last employer in Kuwait. Ranara was employed through the facilitation of Philippine-based employment agency Catalist International Manpower Services Company and its overseas counterpart in Kuwait, Platinum International Office for Recruitment of Domestic Manpower.

==== Death ====
She was found dead, buried in the desert near Al-Salmi Road, on January 21, 2023. Her corpse was found burnt, with her head smashed. An autopsy by Kuwaiti authorities determined that she was pregnant at the time of her death. She was allegedly murdered and raped.

She had reportedly called her family shortly before her death, expressing that she was afraid of her employer's 17-year-old son.

Her family have refused to accept blood money or make a settlement with those associated with the alleged perpetrator.

==== Repatriation and burial of body ====
The body of Ranara was repatriated to the Philippines on January 27, 2023, with expenses shouldered by her employers. The Philippines' National Bureau of Investigation (NBI) started its own autopsy the following day. Her body was buried on February 5, 2023, at the Golden Haven Memorial Park in Las Piñas.

=== Perpetrator ===
Kuwaiti authorities managed to arrest the perpetrator, identified as Turki Ayed Al-Azmi, a 17-year old Kuwaiti national, in less than a day after Ranara was found dead. The perpetrator was determined to be the son of the employer of Ranara.

=== Previous cases and Kuwait–Philippine relations ===
In 2018, a diplomatic crisis between Kuwait and the Philippines arose following the killing of Joanna Demafelis. President Rodrigo Duterte directed a deployment ban for migrant workers to Kuwait. The ban was partially lifted when a deal concerning the protection of migrant workers was struck in May of that year. However, Demafelis' death was followed by the cases of Constancia Lago Dayag (2019) and Jeanelyn Villavende (2020) who were killed by their employers.

== Reactions ==
=== Kuwait ===
On January 29, 2023, Kuwaiti Foreign Minister Sheikh Salen Abdullah Al-Jaber Al-Sabah condemned the killings and expressed condolence to Ranara's family. He added that the perpetrator's actions do not in any way reflect the character and values of Kuwaiti society, the Kuwaiti people and the Kuwaiti government.

On May 26, 2023, Kuwait suspended the issuance of visas for all Philippine nationals indefinitely. The Ministry of Interior of Kuwait said that actions by the Philippine embassy in Kuwait violated a 2018 bilateral labor agreement between the two countries, which was signed after the 2018 discovery of the frozen body of Filipino worker Joanna Demafelis who was murdered by her employers. The violations listed include "housing workers in shelters, searching for runaways without involving state institutions, communicating with Kuwaiti citizens without permission from authorities and pressuring Kuwaiti employers to add clauses to employment contracts." The ban is speculated to be a retaliation against the earlier Philippine ban on the deployment of Filipino workers to Kuwait following the murder of Ranara.

=== Philippines ===
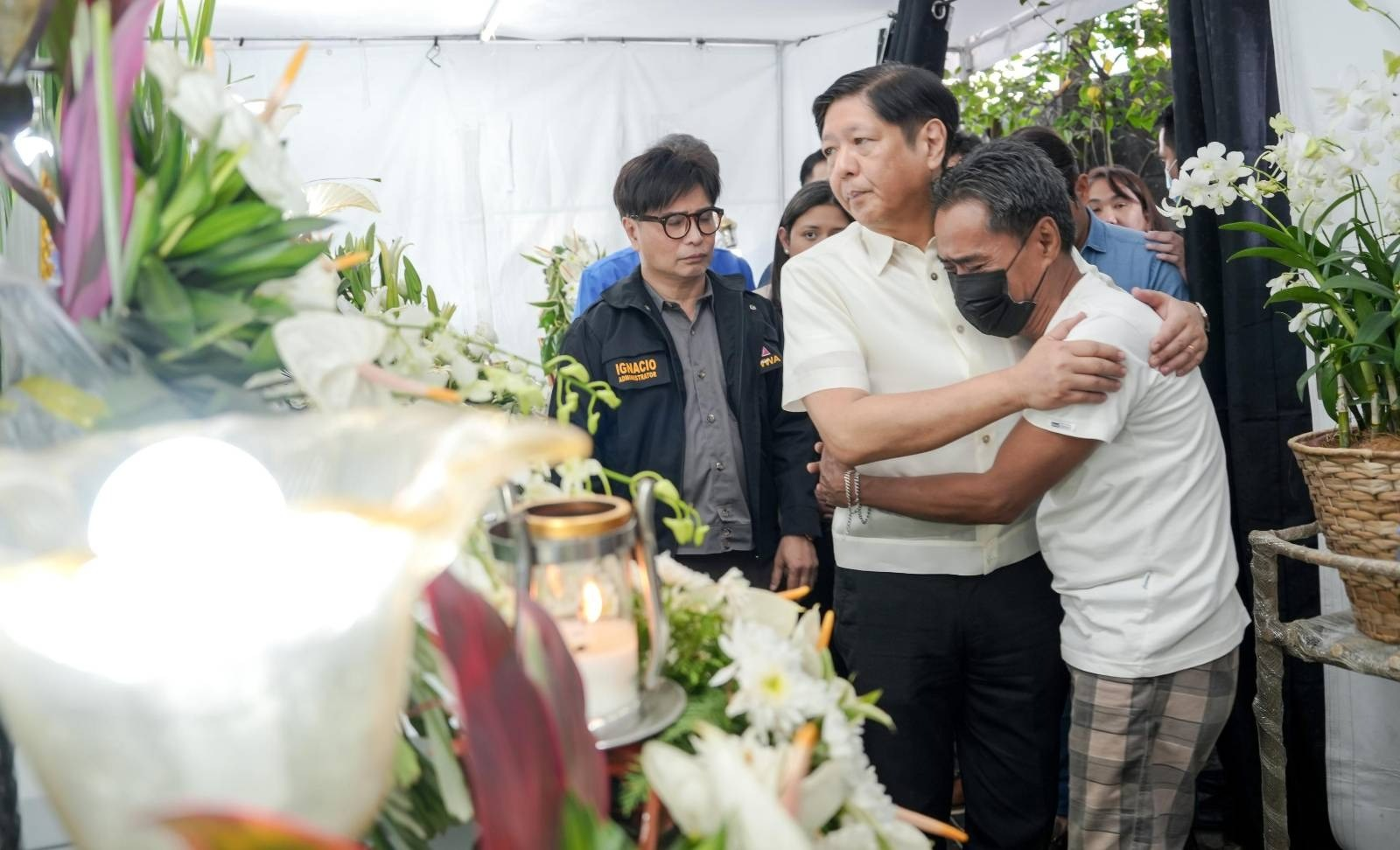
President Bongbong Marcos and OWWA Administrator Arnell Ignacio visit the wake of Ranara in Las Piñas (January 30, 2023)

The Department of Migrant Workers (DMW) led by secretary Susan Ople on January 24 said that they were not considering a total deployment ban for Filipino migrant workers seeking to work in Kuwait finding the Kuwait authorities' actions on the case swift although the department is looking to impose additional safeguards.

Senator Jinggoy Estrada urged an intensified campaign to advocate for the abolishment of the kafala system in Arab nations. Senator Raffy Tulfo on January 29, called for a total deployment ban, saying it would be better to just allow Filipinos to work in places where they are treated better such as in Guam. He also demanded the Kuwaiti government to issue a public apology to the Filipino people. Senators JV Ejercito and Joel Villanueva also called for a deployment ban.

Meanwhile, some legislators in the Committee on Overseas Workers Affairs of the House of Representatives are calling for an investigation on Ranara's recruitment agency, the Catalist International Manpower Services Company. They intend to determine whether the agency is involved in irregular and illegal activities.

President Bongbong Marcos visited the wake for Ranara on January 30, and vowed to extend help and engage with bilateral talks with the Kuwaiti government on the matter.

On February 8, 2023, the DMW imposed a deferral on the deployment of newly hired Filipino household service workers bound to Kuwait. The DMW also issued a preventive suspension on Catalist International's operations as well as intends to file a case against Catalist International and its Kuwaiti counterpart, the Platinum International Office for Recruitment of Domestic Manpower.

== Resolution ==
On September 15, 2023, the Kuwaiti court sentenced Ranara's killer Turki Ayed Al-Azmi to 15-year imprisonment for murder. He was also sentenced an additional year of imprisonment for driving without a license. On February 21, 2024, the State of Kuwait's Appeals Court upheld the guilty verdict and sentence.

Kuwait Crown Prince Mishal Al-Ahmad Al-Jaber Al-Sabah talked with President Bongbong Marcos on the sidelines of the ASEAN-GCC Summit in Riyadh October 2023 regarding the labor dispute between Kuwait and the Philippines. He apologized to Marcos for his country's response to the issue and pledged to commit to resolve the dispute.
