= List of deployment bans on Overseas Filipino Workers =

This is a list of current and past bans on the deployment of Overseas Filipino Workers (OFWs) or Filipino migrant workers to other countries.

== Background ==
The Philippine government assesses which countries where Overseas Filipino Workers (OFWs) can be deployed to by evaluating the general peace and order situation in the country as well as working conditions for migrant workers in a certain country.

=== Peace and order ===
The Department of Foreign Affairs of the Philippines issues four levels of crisis alert levels, a travel warning which also serves as a basis for labor deployment bans for Filipino migrant workers to certain countries.

Crisis Alert Levels
Alert Level	Action
1	"Precautionary phase", No deployment ban
2	"Restriction phase" and ban on deployment of newly hired Overseas Filipino Workers only
3	Voluntary repatriation and total ban on deployment of Overseas Filipino Workers
4	Mandatory repatriation and total ban on deployment of Overseas Filipino Workers

=== Worker conditions ===
Aside from countries experiencing problems with peace and order, the Philippine government can also restrict deployment of Filipino workers to countries determined by the Philippine Department of Foreign Affairs to be non-compliant to the Republic Act 10022 also known as Amended Migrant Workers Act.

A country can be assessed as compliant with the said law if it:

1. Has existing labor and social laws protecting the rights of workers, including migrant workers;
2. Is a signatory to and/or a ratifier of multilateral conventions, declarations or resolutions relating to the protection of workers, including migrant workers; and
3. Has concluded a bilateral agreement or arrangement with the government on the protection of the rights of overseas Filipino workers;

International companies and contractors with operations in non-compliant companies can still deploy Filipinos to countries with no existing ban.

== Current bans ==
=== Nationwide ===
Country	Type	Since	Notes
Afghanistan	Total		Non-compliance to Amended Migrant Workers Act.
Chad	Total		Non-compliance to Amended Migrant Workers Act.
Cuba	Total		Non-compliance to Amended Migrant Workers Act.
Burundi	Total		Unstable peace and order situation
Haiti	Total		Non-compliance to Amended Migrant Workers Act.
Libya	Partial		
Mauritania	Total		Non-compliance to Amended Migrant Workers Act.
Mali	Total		Non-compliance to Amended Migrant Workers Act.
Federated States of Micronesia	Total		An initial total ban ordered on OFW deployment to Micronesia in September 2018 due to reports of abuses and maltreatment of Filipino workers was partially lifted later that month, exempting returning workers from the ban.
North Korea	Total		Non-compliance to Amended Migrant Workers Act.
Niger	Total		Non-compliance to Amended Migrant Workers Act.
Palau	Partial		Ban applies only for domestic workers
Palestine	Total		Non-compliance to Amended Migrant Workers Act.
Rwanda	Total		Unstable peace and order situation
Somalia	Total		Non-compliance to Amended Migrant Workers Act; Unstable peace and order situation
South Sudan	Partial		
Syria	Total		Unstable peace and order situation
Yemen	Total		Unstable peace and order situation
Ukraine	Total		Unstable peace and order situation (Russian invasion of Ukraine)
Zimbabwe	Total		Non-compliance to Amended Migrant Workers Act.

=== Ban on select areas ===
Region / Area	Country	Type	Since	Notes
Chechnya	Russia	Total		Unstable peace and order situation
Iraqi Kurdistan	Iraq	Partial		
Rest of Iraq	Iraq	Total		Unstable peace and order situation
Nationwide except Khartoum and Kenana Sugar Plantation in the White Nile	Sudan	Total	March 30, 2005	Unstable peace and order situation

== Previous bans ==
Country	Type	From	Notes
Nigeria	Total	January 22, 2007–March 13, 2007	A total ban was imposed in January 2007 following incidents of kidnappings in Nigeria. Partially lifted in March 2007 to allow returning Filipino migrant workers employed in Nigeria. Total ban was reimposed in 2008 and includes Filipino seafarers boarded on ships docking on Nigerian ports.
Nigeria	Partial	March 13, 2007–January 31, 2008	A total ban was imposed in January 2007 following incidents of kidnappings in Nigeria. Partially lifted in March 2007 to allow returning Filipino migrant workers employed in Nigeria. Total ban was reimposed in 2008 and includes Filipino seafarers boarded on ships docking on Nigerian ports.
Nigeria	Total	January 31, 2008–August 12, 2009	A total ban was imposed in January 2007 following incidents of kidnappings in Nigeria. Partially lifted in March 2007 to allow returning Filipino migrant workers employed in Nigeria. Total ban was reimposed in 2008 and includes Filipino seafarers boarded on ships docking on Nigerian ports.
Nigeria	Partial	August 12, 2009–March 21, 2012	A total ban was imposed in January 2007 following incidents of kidnappings in Nigeria. Partially lifted in March 2007 to allow returning Filipino migrant workers employed in Nigeria. Total ban was reimposed in 2008 and includes Filipino seafarers boarded on ships docking on Nigerian ports.
Kuwait	Total	February 12, 2018–May 12, 2018	Due to the 2018 Kuwait–Philippine diplomatic crisis the Philippines banned the deployment of Filipino workers to Kuwait in February 2018. Deployment of "skilled" and "semi-skilled" were allowed on May 12 and the ban was completely lifted on May 16.
Kuwait	Partial	May 12, 2018–May 16, 2018	Due to the 2018 Kuwait–Philippine diplomatic crisis the Philippines banned the deployment of Filipino workers to Kuwait in February 2018. Deployment of "skilled" and "semi-skilled" were allowed on May 12 and the ban was completely lifted on May 16.
Libya	Total	February 22, 2011–December 20, 2011	POEA suspended the deployment of Filipino workers to Libya due to political unrest. In December 2011, workers in the medical and petroleum industry began to be gradually deployed to Libya. The situation in Libya was assessed to have been improved when the Alert Level on Libya was reduced to level 1 from level 2 on February 23, 2012, and the ban was fully lifted in March 2012.
Libya	Partial	December 20, 2011–March 21, 2012	POEA suspended the deployment of Filipino workers to Libya due to political unrest. In December 2011, workers in the medical and petroleum industry began to be gradually deployed to Libya. The situation in Libya was assessed to have been improved when the Alert Level on Libya was reduced to level 1 from level 2 on February 23, 2012, and the ban was fully lifted in March 2012.
