= Yiohan =

The Yiohan was the name of a ship involved in human trafficking. It made its way to the coast of Sicily, on the night of December 24, 1996, carrying illegal immigrants from Sri Lanka, India and Pakistan. Its drunken captain Yusuf Al Halal forced over 300 immigrants at gunpoint onto another smaller ship. Survivors claim that he deliberately steered and rammed the much larger Yiohan into the smaller wooden ship, thereby causing the deaths of 283 people. He was charged with murder, as he did not make any attempt to rescue survivors. The charges against him were however dropped as the incident happened 19 miles away from the Sicilian coast in international waters and didn't fall under Italian jurisdiction. The incident was downplayed and denied until 2001, when a fisherman found an ID card of a drowned Sri Lankan victim and contacted a journalist of newspaper La Repubblica in Rome.
