= Kafala system =

System used to monitor migrant laborers in Arab countries

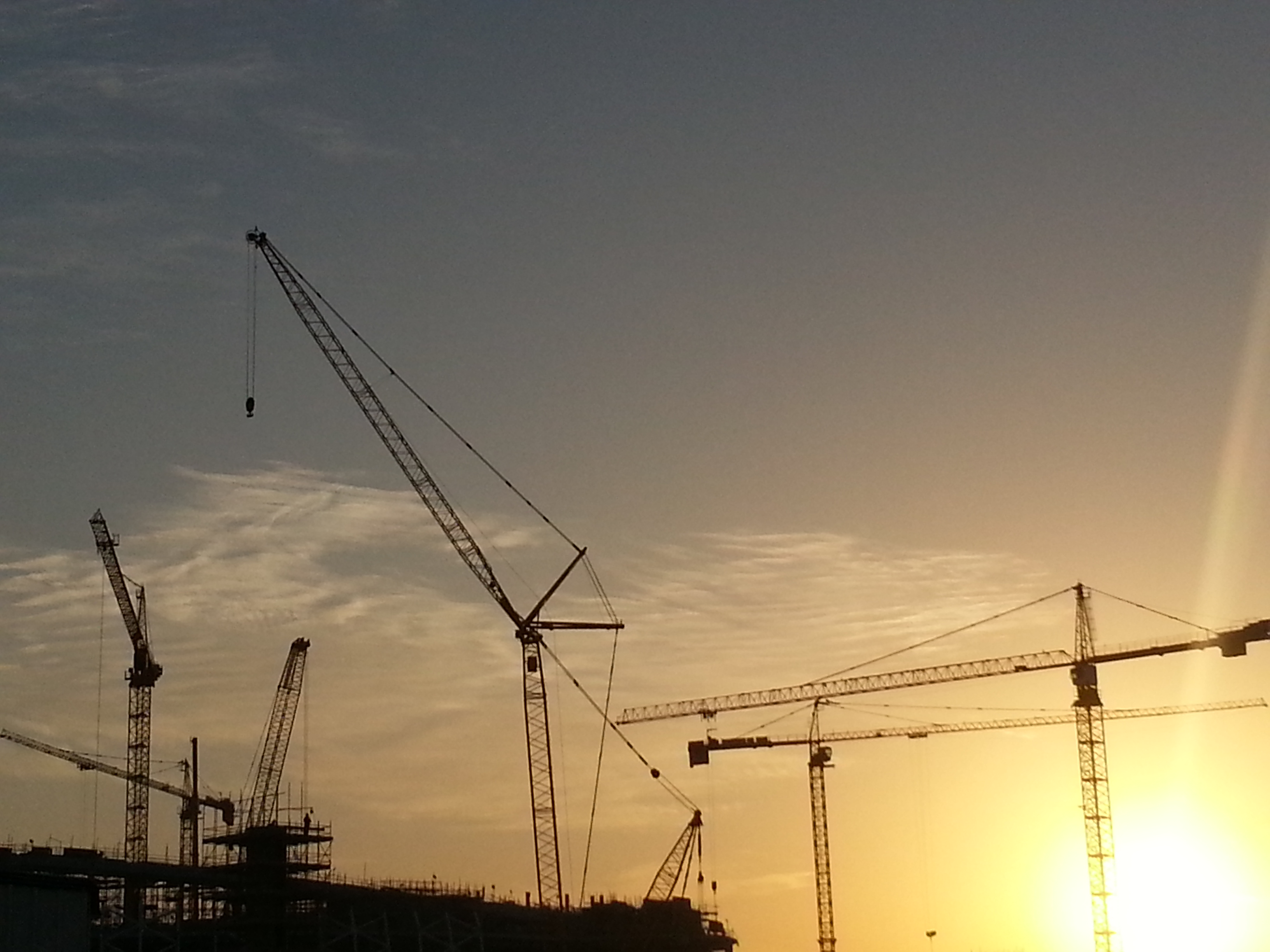
The kafala system in Qatar has been linked to labor abuses that occurred during the construction of the venues for the 2022 FIFA World Cup (pictured here, Al Thumama Stadium; one of the World Cup stadiums, under construction in 2013).

The kafala system or kefala system (Arabic: نظام الكفالة niẓām al-kafāla, lit. 'sponsorship system') is a system in the Middle East that involves binding the residency and employment status of a migrant worker to a specific employer throughout the period of their residence in a country. Under this arrangement, the employer holds substantial authority over the worker, including the ability to approve or deny job changes, and permission to leave the country. This dependency creates a significant power imbalance that heightens the risk of exploitation and abusive practices. It currently exists in many Arab countries, especially those in the Arabian Peninsula, with Lebanon, Jordan and Kuwait also being very prominent. A similar "binding system" existed in Israel until 2006, when the Israeli Supreme Court struck it down, though it continues to be heavily practiced in certain industries.

The system, which blocks domestic competition for overseas workers in the Arab countries of the Persian Gulf, requires migrant workers to have an in-country sponsor, usually their employer, who is responsible for their visa and legal status. This practice has been criticized by human rights organizations for creating easy opportunities for the exploitation of workers, as many employers confiscate their migrant workers' passports and abuse them with little chance of legal repercussions and even repatriation. In 2014, the International Trade Union Confederation estimated that there were 2.4 million enslaved domestic workers in the Arab Gulf countries and the Levant. Virtually all of these enslaved workers were from West Africa, South Asia and Southeast Asia.

== Etymology and origin ==
In the first decades of the 21st century, the migrant worker system became widely referred to the "kafala system" in English. The word kafala comes from Arabic, and the related word kafeel refers to the local employment sponsor in the system. In Islamic adoptional jurisprudence, "kafala" refers to the adoption of children. The original law of kafala was expanded to include a system of fixed-term sponsorship of migrant workers in several countries in the late 20th century. This modern system has its origins in labour practices related to pearl hunting. In the Persian Gulf, the pearling industry was dominated by slave labour, and prior to the abolition of slavery in the 20th century, slaves were used as pearl divers.

Kafala as a legal framework has roots in Sharia law, in which one party (the kafil) acts as a guarantor for another (the makful), where the former assumes legal responsibilities if the makful is unable to meet them. The arrangement generally takes two forms: one where the guarantor is responsible for the person himself—such as ensuring good conduct or appearance in court, similar to a bail system—and another where the guarantor assumes responsibility for the payment of a debt should the makful back out.

Scholars offer differing explanations regarding the origins of the kafala system. Gilbert Beaugé argues that it "originated from an old Bedouin custom of granting protection to visitors." Anh Longva suggests that the system is a "well-anchored" Kuwaiti tradition. Omar al-Shehabi, on the other hand, argued that the modern kafala system "was a product of the British colonial era, particularly the period from the 1920s until independence in the 1970s". Al-Shehabi notes that British colonial administrators, who viewed migrant labour "as both a necessity and a problem that needed to be regulated and controlled", introduced sponsorship requirements to control the migration of labourers to the Gulf states.

== Workers' rights under kafala ==
In January 2024, domestic workers constituted approximately 32.4% of female employment in the Arab states. Many continued to face various forms of abuse. According to the International Labour Organization, "The informal, unregulated and isolated nature of their work renders migrant domestic workers vulnerable to exploitation, abuse and forced labour. Often, they are denied many basic labour rights related to freedom of association, remuneration, working hours, periods of rest, retention of their identity documents, leave and freedom of movement outside the households they work in."

Exploitation of migrant workers may occur even before their arrival in the host country. Private recruitment agencies, which oversee significant portions of the migration process, engage in unethical practices such as imposing high recruitment charges, withholding workers' identity documents, and offering incomplete or inaccurate information about rights and working conditions. Recruitment also takes place through online social media chatrooms. For example, in March 2016, a closed Facebook group titled "Maids in Qatar," had nearly 9,000 members and featured dozens of weekly posts advertising or seeking domestic work. The Migrant Rights Research Open Repository argued that the lack of regulation of the chatrooms made workers vulnerable to traffickers.

Government policies have contributed to irregular recruitment channels. As of 2018, the Philippines did not process employment contracts for workers bound for the United Arab Emirates, as the UAE had not permitted the Philippine labour attaché to verify contracts. This situation created a black market for Filipino domestic workers.

Recruitment agencies often advertise the salary of domestic workers according to the country of origin of the workers.

A 2024 Human Rights Watch report documented various labour rights violations impacting workers in the United Arab Emirates under the Kafala system. Employers were able to falsely charge workers for "absconding" in abusive situations, exposing workers to arrest, fines, and potentially deportation. Legal trade unions were absent. UAE based workers were also exposed to extreme weather conditions without sufficient protections.

Independent human rights organizations have advocated for an end to abuses against migrant workers. The United Nations special rapporteur on the protection of the labour and human rights of migrants reported on the human rights violations against migrant workers, and called on states to "align domestic laws with international standards and improve enforcement mechanisms."

Some instances of labour rights abuses led to governments imposing bans on their citizens working in the country where the abuses occurred. One case involved Jeanelyn Villavende, a migrant worker from the Philippines who was killed in Kuwait in January 2020 following severe physical and sexual abuse by her employers. Her death led the Philippine government to implement a deployment ban on Filipino workers bound for Kuwait.

These bans, while intended to protect migrant workers, may also place them in difficult circumstances. The International Labour Organization argued that the bans create difficulties for migrant women, citing a particular case in Nepal:

"The age ban and total ban had a number of unintended consequences for women, including making potential women migrant workers apprehensive about revealing their plans for fear of being stopped from migrating. Potential migrant women are no longer attending orientation and training and are becoming less active in seeking out information from official sources. Travelling irregularly also excluded women migrant domestic workers from the benefits of private insurance, and the Welfare Fund in Nepal, namely financial compensation in case of accident or death in destination countries ... [The ban] had reduced the power of recruitment agencies and strengthened unlicensed migrant agents operating out of villages that are associated with deception, fraud and trafficking of women. Finally, many described migration for work as the only economic opportunity available to women, as well as a personal opportunity to travel, to avoid early marriage or abusive and/or unwanted relationships."

Programs and initiatives intended to strengthen labour protections were introduced in some countries. In Oman, the Social Protection Law (Royal Decree No. 52/2023) expanded social security coverage to include foreign workers, providing benefits such as workplace injury protection, sick leave, and maternity leave. The government established individual accounts to finance end-of-service benefits for foreign workers.

The Omani law includes a number of broader reforms related to employment conditions, disciplinary procedures, penalties, and time limits for filing claims, as well as compensation for unfair dismissal. Among its provisions, the law specifies that dismissals on discriminatory grounds—such as sex, origin, color, language, religion, creed, social status, disability, pregnancy, childbirth, breastfeeding, or labor-union affiliation—constitute unfair dismissal. It outlines rules on working hours and types of leave and recognizes additional forms of employment, including casual, temporary, part-time, and remote work. The law further permits employees to terminate their employment.

Proposed reforms in several states have drawn criticism. Nisha Varia, of Human Rights Watch, stated that "even the proposed reforms [in regards to legal reforms in Saudi Arabia, Kuwait, the United Arab Emirates, Qatar, and Lebanon] fall short of international standards and the comprehensive protections other countries are implementing."

Grassroots organizations contribute to advocacy efforts on behalf of migrant domestic workers. Groups such as Migrant-Rights.org document reported abuses, promote public awareness, and support calls for policy reform.

== Per country ==
=== Bahrain ===
In 2009, Bahrain was the first country in the Gulf Cooperation Council (GCC) to repeal the kafala system. In a public statement, the Labour Minister likened the system to slavery. Changes to the Labour Market Regulatory Law were made in April 2009 and implemented starting 1 August 2009. Under the new law, migrants are sponsored by the Labour Market Regulation Authority and can change from one employer to another without their employer's agreement. Three months' notice is required to quit from an employer.

However, in November 2009 Human Rights Watch stated that "authorities do little to enforce compliance" with "employers who withhold wages and passports from migrant employees ... practices [which] are illegal under Bahraini law."

=== Israel ===
For years through the year 2006, Israel effectively maintained a kafala system, which in Israel was called the "binding system". As with the kafala system, migrant laborers in Israel were tied to a specific employer for the duration of their visas. Over the years when Israel maintained this system, passport confiscation and other abuses were systematic and effectively went unpunished.

The Israeli Supreme Court struck down the Israeli version of the kafala system in a landmark March 2006 decision, Kav LaOved Worker's Hotline v. Government of Israel, with the Court citing human rights concerns. While the 2006 decision removed the Israeli version of the kafala system in a formal sense, a 2014 study by Israeli labour scholars Adriana Kemp and Rebeca Raijman claimed that the binding system still applied to migrant domestic workers, though not to migrant workers in general. Abuses of migrant non-domestic workers in Israel remained widespread as of 2015; a 2015 study by Human Rights Watch found that almost all Thai migrant workers on kibbutzim in Israel lived in squalor, were denied regular days off, and were worked beyond, and paid below, legally mandated requirements.

=== Kuwait ===
The kafala system is practiced in Kuwait. In 2018, Kuwait became involved in a diplomatic crisis with the Philippines, which ended in a May 2018 labor deal which prohibited common practices under the kafala against Filipino migrant workers, including the confiscation of passports and guaranteeing one day off a week from work.

=== Oman ===
In Oman, the kafala system is regulated by the foreign residency law and accompanying laws, while the system is enforced by the Ministry of Manpower and the Royal Oman Police. According to Oman's 2003 Labour Law, an employer needs a permit issued by the Ministry of Manpower in order to import foreign workers. Furthermore, migrant workers are prohibited from working for another employer. The Labour Law places responsibility for the migrant worker on the employer. The 2003 Law also sets conditions for the labour contract, as well as the rights and obligations of both employers and migrant workers, including the provision of medical facilities, suitable means of transport, and a minimum wage by the Council of Ministers. In addition, if a migrant worker wishes to change employers, the employee needs to receive a No Objection Certificate from the employer.

In 2011, Oman reportedly informed the United Nations Human Rights Council that alternatives to the kafala system were being considered. However, the sponsorship system still remains in place. Legislative amendments to the Omani labour laws were under consideration in late 2016. The Ministry of Manpower also announced in 2016 the abolition of the obligatory No Objection Certificate.

=== Qatar ===
In 2026, both Human Rights Watch and Amnesty International stated that foreign labourers in Qatar still faced widespread abuses under the Kafala system, which they described as "restrictive" and "exploitative". Human Rights Watch's report said that reforms had had "limited impact", and that Qatar had failed to address serious violations against workers, who still "face[d] wage theft, unexplained deaths, dangerous working conditions and continued exploitation".

In 2025, foreign workers made up around 91% of Qatar's population, constituting around 95% of its labour force, coming mostly from India, Pakistan, Bangladesh, Nepal, and the Philippines. According to the International Labour Organization, Qatar does not consider this population as "migrant workers", but rather as "guests" or "non-Qataris".

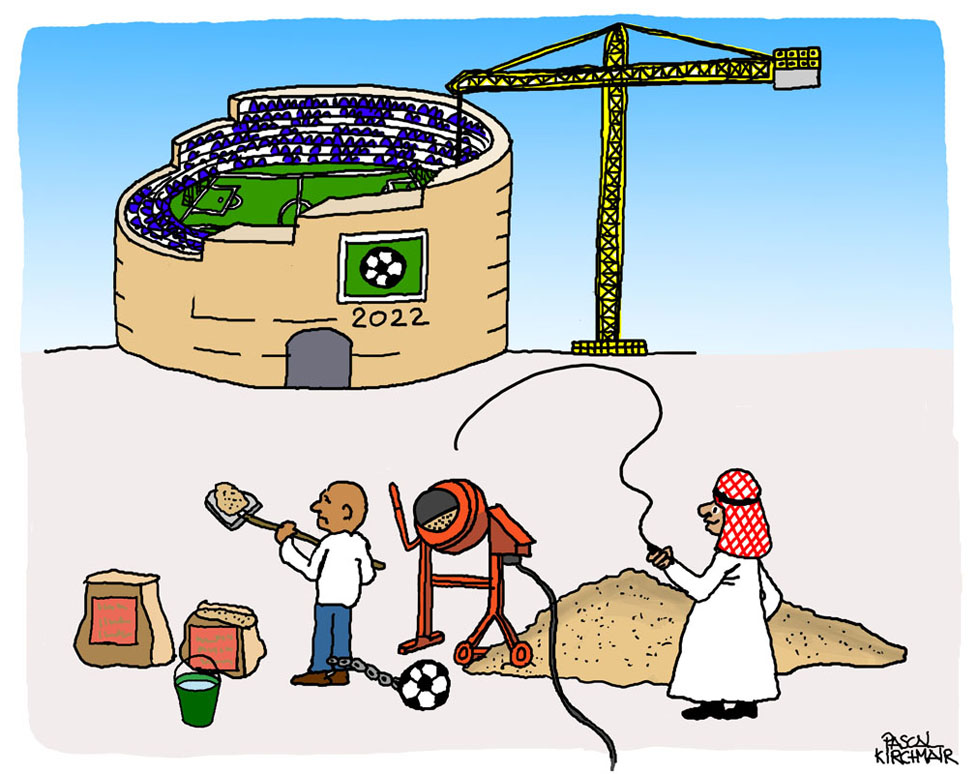
A political cartoon depicting slave labour in the construction of the stadiums in Qatar ahead of the 2022 FIFA World Cup (see also: 2022 FIFA World Cup controversies)

Since before 2010, when Qatar was granted hosting rights for the 2022 FIFA World Cup, the human rights situation of foreign workers in the country was criticized by international human rights organizations. Workers had reported "being treated like cattle with long hours and no days off", and studies of working conditions reported high death rates. A report by the Qatari government reported almost 1,000 deaths due to working conditions, and others reported higher numbers.

In 2010, Qatar receiving the rights to host the 2022 FIFA World Cup brought renewed interest in previous reports on the systemic abuse of foreign workers in the country, as well as much-increased scrutiny and new reports, investigations and statements by various international human rights and news organizations.

Various organizations expressed concern both about the message of choosing such a country to host the World Cup, and about the potential human costs of the massive construction boom required for the hosting. Human Rights Watch has stated that "FIFA granted Qatar the games in 2010, with no human rights due diligence and no set conditions about protections for migrant workers who would be needed to construct the massive infrastructure."

In 2016, a BBC reporting crew was jailed for two days without charge, after attempting to meet migrant workers.

Between 2014 and 2021, Qatar has announced and enacted many steps of reform, including announcing multiple times that the Kafala system was effectively abolished. Despite these steps, international human rights organizations have rejected the claims that Kafala was abolished. In their reports for the year 2025 both Human Rights Watch and Amnesty International have found that foreign labourers in Qatar continue to face widespread abuses under a "restrictive" and "exploitative" Kafala system. Human Rights Watch's report said that the reforms have had "limited impact", and that the country has failed to address serious violations against workers, who still "face wage theft, unexplained deaths, dangerous working conditions and continued exploitation after the tournament."

=== Romania ===
Romania does not operate a fully legal kafala system. Some aspects of its labour migration framework for non-European Union (EU) workers can create vulnerabilities associated with employer-dependent migration systems. Romania experienced a sharp increase in labour migration due to domestic labour shortages, leading authorities to recruit tens of thousands of workers from outside the EU, particularly from South Asia and Southeast Asia.

Many of these workers originate from countries such as Bangladesh, India, Nepal, and Sri Lanka, and are typically employed in sectors including construction, logistics, hospitality, and delivery services. Non-EU workers generally enter Romania through a system requiring a work permit tied to a specific employer, which can create a degree of dependency on that employer.

Documented cases of exploitation involving migrant workers include misleading recruitment practices, unpaid wages, and poor living or working conditions. Some workers reported being recruited under false promises and facing significantly different conditions upon arrival.

Due to these factors, observers compared Romania's labour migration system to systems such as kafala, particularly regarding employer-linked permits and limited mobility in practice. Romania's system remains legally distinct from kafala systems: employers do not have formal control over a worker's freedom of movement, and migrant workers retain legal rights and protections under Romanian and EU law, However most cases have been ignored and very rarely prosecuted due to Romania's severe workforce shortage mainly caused by millions of Romanians immigrating to Western European and North American countries, particularly Germany, Italy, Spain and the United States for better conditions.

As of September 2025, more than 140,000 non-EU workers from Bangladesh, Nepal, Sri Lanka, India and several other countries from South and Southeast Asia were legally working in Romania, with over 37,600 non-EU workers legally working in Bucharest alone. In 2023, the number of non-EU workers in the Bucharest–Ilfov area was nearly 56,000.

=== Saudi Arabia ===
From 1991 to 2019, 300,000 Bangladeshi women went to Saudi Arabia under the kafala system. In early November 2019, protests took place in Dhaka in response to the case of Sumi Akter, who claimed "merciless sexual assaults", being locked up for 15 days, and having her hands burnt by hot oil by her Saudi employers. The case of another Bangladeshi, Nazma Begum, who claimed being tortured, also attracted media attention. Both had been promised jobs as hospital cleaning staff but were tricked into becoming household servants. Begum died in Saudi Arabia of an untreated illness.

According to a 2008 HRW report, under the kafala system in Saudi Arabia, "an employer assumes responsibility for a hired migrant worker and must grant explicit permission before the worker can enter Saudi Arabia, transfer employment, or leave the country. The kafala system gives the employer immense control over the worker." HRW stated that "some abusive employers exploit the kafala system and force domestic workers to continue working against their will and forbid them from returning to their countries of origin" and that this is "incompatible with Article 13 of the Universal Declaration of Human Rights". HRW stated that "the combination of the high recruitment fees paid by Saudi employers and the power granted them by the kafala system to control whether a worker can change employers or exit the country made some employers feel entitled to exert 'ownership' over a domestic worker" and that the "sense of ownership ... creates slavery-like conditions". In 2018, France 24 and ALQST reported on the use of Twitter and other online social networks by kafala system employers, "kafeels", to "sell" domestic workers to other kafeels, in violation of Saudi law. ALQST described the online trading as "slavery 2.0".

During 2015–2018, Several Indonesian domestic workers were executed in Saudi Arabia. Siti Zaeneb and Karni were beheaded in April 2015. Muhammad Zaini Misin was executed in March 2018 for having killed his employer. On 29 October 2018, Tuti Tursilawati, also an Indonesian domestic worker in Saudi Arabia, was executed for having killed her employer, an action which she claimed had been in self-defense in relation to sexual abuse. Indonesian Foreign Minister Retno Marsudi lodged an official complaint concerning the execution, which was carried out without warning and despite an appeal against the sentence.

On 4 November 2020, as part of its 2030 vision, Saudi Arabia announced a reformation plan for its labour law. Effective on 14 March 2021, the new measures are meant to curb the kafala system through:

1. Mandatory digital documentation of labor contracts.
2. Dropping the stipulation of sponsor consent for exit visas, final exit visas, re-entry visas, and change of sponsor, so long as they are to be applied for after the end of a contractual term or an appropriate notice period previously specified in the contract. Other requirements may still apply in case of applying within a contractual term.

The changes were to be implemented in the Absher and Qiwa portals, both being part of the e-government in Saudi Arabia.

In March 2021, Saudi Arabia introduced new labour reforms, allowing some migrant workers to change jobs without their employer's consent. Human Rights Watch claimed that the reforms did not dismantle the abuses of the kafala system, "leaving migrant workers at high risk of abuse". Many domestic workers and farmers who are not covered by the labour law are still vulnerable to multifold abuses, including passport confiscation, delayed wages and even forced labour. Although migrant workers are allowed to request an exit permit without their employer's permission, the need to have an exit permit in order to leave the country is a human rights violation. An investigation by France 24 in April 2021 documented abuses of female migrant workers in Saudi Arabia. A 22-year-old woman migrant worker from Madagascar was murdered by the underground prostitution mafia she used to work for after running away from her employer's home and buried without a coffin in al-Jubail. Due to the practice of some sponsors who confiscate the passports of migrant workers, young women from East Africa find it difficult to return home after perceived mistreatment by their employers. The women often end up falling into prostitution.

In June 2025, Saudi Arabia allegedly made an announcement declaring the abolishment of the kafala system, as part of the Saudi Vision 2030 reform program. The Times of India interpreted the apparent announcement as aiming to attract foreign investment, "modernise" Saudi Arabia's reputation, and also as a response to criticism by human rights groups, Western governments and corporations of labour rights abuses in GCC member states. Prior to the apparent June 2025 announcement, Amnesty International criticised abuses of workers' rights in the preparations for the 2034 FIFA World Cup, to be held in Saudi Arabia. It should be noted there are claims that the existence of the announcement abolishing the kafala system is spin, which is to say disinformation. There are no official government sources that corroborate any such announcement being made.

=== United Arab Emirates ===
The United Arab Emirates has a work visa sponsorship system to issue work permits for certain foreign nationals who wish to migrate for work in the UAE. Most of the visas are sponsored by institutions and companies. A person looking to enter the UAE for work obtains a work permit, valid for two months, from the Ministry of Human Resources. The sponsor is responsible for medical testing and obtaining identity cards, documents and stamps. The employee can then sponsor his or her family members and bring them into the UAE.

Per Article 1 of Ministerial Decree No. 766 of 2015, an employee whose contract expires can obtain a new permit and may remain in the UAE on a 6-month job seeker visa. A new work permit is also issued if the employer fails legal and contractual obligations such as not paying wages for 60 days. A worker may request his contract to be terminated after at least 6 months of employment. A worker whose employment is terminated unfairly has the right to receive a new work permit without the six-month condition.

The right of alien residence and work permit is protected by the UAE Federal law No. 6 of 1973 on the Entry and Residence of aliens. Per UAE law, an employer may not deny an employee on a work visa right to an annual leave, regular paid wage, 45 days maternity leave, right to resign, resign gratuity, and a 30-day grace period to find a new job. An employer is also prohibited by law from confiscating an employee's passport, forcing the employee to pay for his or her residency visa fees, or forcing the employee to work more than eight hours a day or 45 hours a week without compensation. An employee who wishes to leave needs to complete his or her legal notice period, which is usually 30 days or less, before leaving their job or risk being banned to work in UAE for up to one year. Alien widows or divorced women whose legal presence in the country was sponsored by their husband's work status are given a one-year visa to stay in the country without the need for a work permit or a sponsor.

In October 2014, Human Rights Watch estimated that there were 146,000 female migrant domestic workers in the UAE whose work visa was sponsored by employers in the UAE. In an interview with 99 female domestic workers, HRW listed abuses claimed by their interviewees: most had their passports confiscated by their employers; in many cases, wages were not fully paid, overtime (up to 21 hours per day) was required, or food, living conditions or medical treatment was insufficient. 24 had been physically or sexually abused.

HRW criticized the UAE government for failing to adequately protect domestic workers from exploitation and abuse and made many recommendations to the UAE, including repeal or amendment of Federal Law No. 6 of 1973 on the Entry and Residence of Foreigners, so that domestic workers can decide on their own to change between employers without losing their immigration status. The UAE introduced Ministerial Decree No. 766 of 2015, which allows a worker to terminate his contract without losing their immigration status if the employer has treated him or her unfairly and be issued a new work permit, or to request the contract to be terminated without losing immigration status and receive a new work permit after at least 6 months of employment provided they have found a new employer.

The act of confiscating passports is illegal under UAE law.

In June 2017, the UAE adopted a new bill to bring its labour law into consistency with the International Labour Organization's (ILO) Domestic Workers Convention, providing migrant domestic workers with the same labour protections as other UAE employees. The bill requires employers to provide domestic workers with accommodation and food, an annual minimum of 30 days paid leave, 15 days of paid sick leave, 15 days of unpaid sick leave, compensation for work-related injuries or illnesses, and 12 hours' daily rest.

=== United Kingdom ===
In the United Kingdom, visas which prohibit employees from discontinuing working for their employer for any reason are known as "tied visas". On 6 April 2012, the British government made the Domestic Overseas Worker Visa a tied visa. The rule was changed in an effort to reduce net migration to the UK. This has been described as establishing a kafala system. Human rights abuses of migrant domestic workers increased following the 2012 change in rules.

== See also ==
- Middle East and Islamic world
  - History of slavery in the Muslim world
  - Islamic views on slavery
  - Human rights in Muslim-majority countries
  - Migrant workers in the Gulf Cooperation Council region
  - Treatment of South Asian labourers in the Gulf Cooperation Council region
  - Criticism of Islam
- General
  - Debt bondage
  - Exit visa, visa required to exit the host country
  - Illegal emigration, departure from a country in violation of emigration laws
  - Illegal immigration, arrival in a country in violation of emigration laws
  - Workforce nationalization, government policy of mandatory employment of native-born population
