= Refrigerator death =

Death that may occur due to suffocation inside a refrigerator

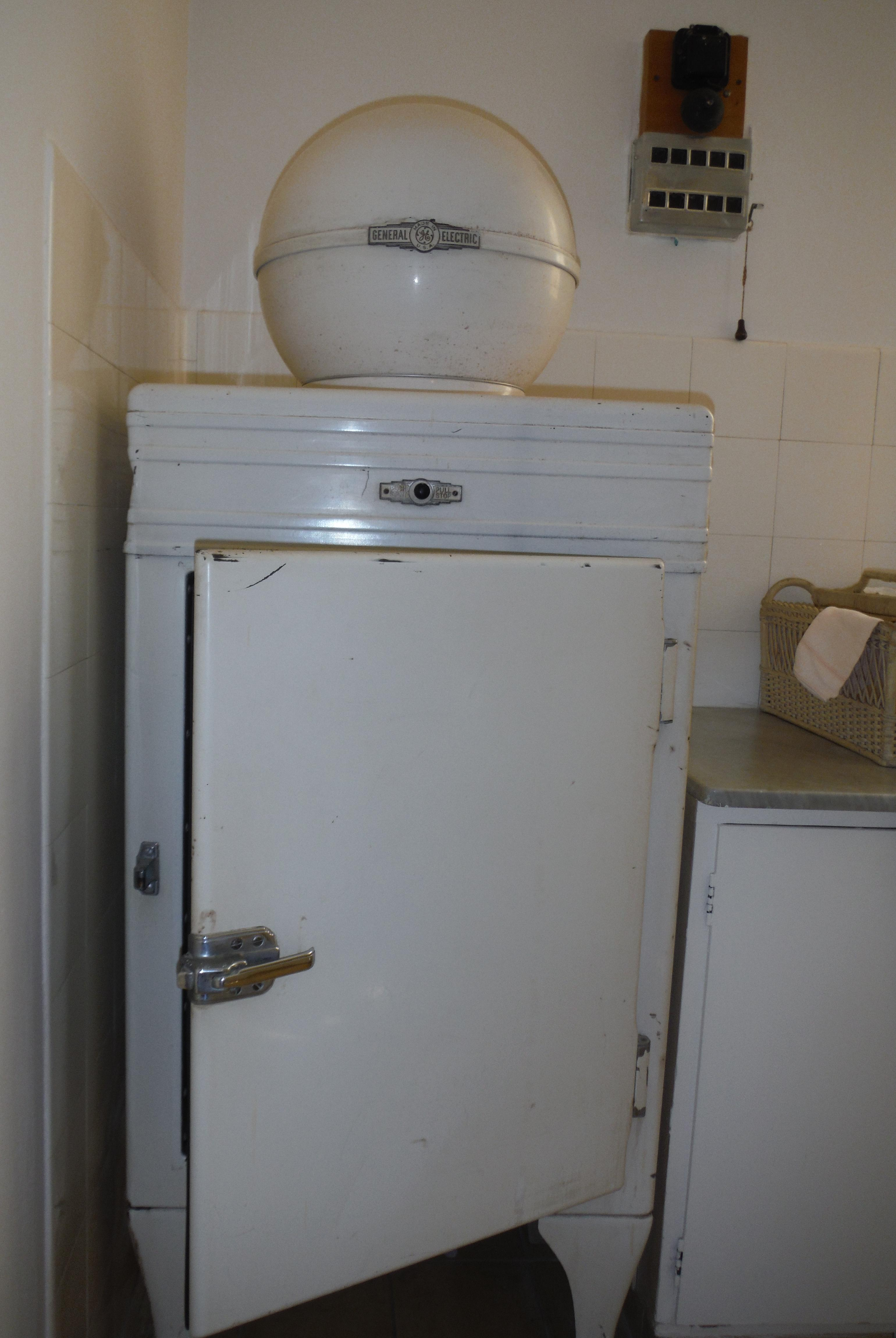
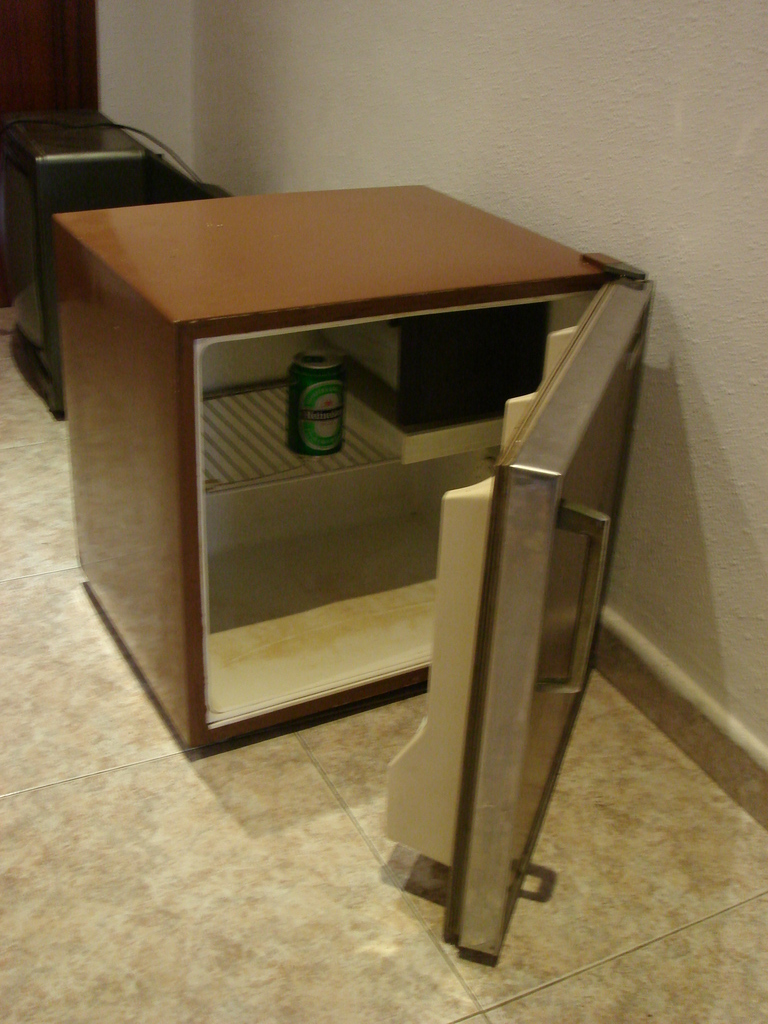
An older refrigerator (c.1942) with a closing latch and a newer mini fridge which uses magnets to hold the door closed

A refrigerator death is death by suffocation in a refrigerator or other air-tight appliance. Because, by design, such appliances are air-tight when closed, a person trapped inside will have a low supply of oxygen. Until around 1958, refrigerators could only be opened from the outside, making accidental entrapment a possibility, particularly of children playing with discarded appliances; many such deaths have been recorded. Modern designs have a magnetic closure that can be opened by pushing from the inside.

== History ==
The original "refrigerator" was a household appliance that kept food cold using blocks of ice; now called the "icebox", these cabinets became popular in the 1800s and early 1900s. The first modern electrical refrigerator to see widespread use was the General Electric "Monitor-Top" refrigerator, introduced in 1927, and refrigerators became common in the United States in the 1930s. Regardless of the cooling technology, doors on the units were sealed shut using a mechanical latch. After World War II when production of refrigerators resumed, old refrigerators were often disposed of. By the mid-1950s, deaths were not uncommon for children in the United States. For example, statistics for the 18 months from January 1954 to June 1956 show that 54 children were known to have been trapped in household refrigerators, and that 39 of them died. As the issue rose in prominence, people were asked not to abandon refrigerators and to detach the doors of unused refrigerators. At least one state, Oklahoma, enacted legislation making the abandonment of a refrigerator with a latch, in a location where a child might find it, illegal. At least as early as 1954, alternative methods of securing air-tight closures had been suggested, such as in patent 2767011, filed by Francis P. Buckley et al. in 1954 and issued in 1956. Starting in the mid-1950s, volunteers and health inspectors searched out abandoned refrigerators in order to detach doors and break latches. However, these efforts were not entirely effective and children still died inside refrigerators that had not been found and dismantled.

=== American legislation ===
The Refrigerator Safety Act in 1956 was a U.S. law that required a change in the way refrigerator doors stay shut. It was codified at 15 U.S.C. 1211–1214 as Public Law 84-930, 70 Stat. 953, on 2 August 1956. The act applied to all refrigerators manufactured in the United States after 31 October 1958, and is largely responsible for the adoption of the magnetic mechanism that is used today instead of a latch. Individual American states also have similar laws, such as California and Washington. Around the world, manufacture of latch refrigerators has been replaced by that of ones with magnet-closing doors.

The number of U.S. and Canadian deaths due to suffocation in refrigerators declined a significant amount in the years following federal legislation. A 1985 study of suffocation deaths in the United States showed a sharp decline in the early 1960s, followed by a plateau and gradual decline to the early 1980s. The Refrigerator Safety Act was a factor in the decline, in combination with other factors such as "reduced exposure and increased parental supervision".

== Entrapment hazards ==
Hazardous factors in refrigerator deaths are "places with a poor air supply, a heavy lid or a self-latching door". Children playing games – such as hide and seek – may crawl inside a small secret place, such as an appliance, and become trapped. The water-tight or air-tight seal prevents them from getting air, and the appliance's noise insulation prevents their screams from being heard. Suffocation follows.

Apart from refrigerators and similar equipment such as iceboxes, freezers, and coolers, equipment such as clothes washers, dryers, and toy chests can also put children at risk of refrigerator death.

== Modern examples ==
- 2013: Three South African children died after becoming locked in an abandoned refrigerator.
- 2014: Two sisters died in Novgorod Oblast, Russia, when they hid in their grandmother's refrigerator.
- 2019: Two siblings and a friend – ages 1, 4, and 6 – died after climbing inside a chest freezer that was sitting, unused and unplugged, in their family's yard in Florida, United States. A hasp for a padlock had been installed, but the unit was not locked. After the children climbed inside, the lid fell and the hasp engaged, which prevented them from getting out.
- 2019: Two brothers in Kyrgyzstan – ages 4 and 6 – died while playing hide and seek, when they became trapped in an abandoned refrigerator that had been built with an "automatic locking system". The type of fridge was particularly popular in the Soviet era and was specially built so that it could not be opened from the inside."

== Prevention ==
Product design can be used to mitigate risk. An example is substitution of magnetic strips for sealing doors, instead of latches. In addition, appliances should be recalled when a danger is identified.

Public education is effective. Education programs may include public service announcements, pamphlets, advertisements in magazines and newspapers, articles in newspapers, and school-based programming to educate children. One such example is a 1971 public information film shown in the United Kingdom called 'Children and Disused Fridges', which became well known due to its frightening message. A Canadian study showed that the most effective safety education was "targeted, simple, action-oriented messaging" especially when "combined with strategies to change behaviour." Common education campaigns focus on parent awareness and reminding owners that appliance doors should be removed before discarding.

Parents or caregivers can lessen the risks of refrigerator deaths. Spaces can be made safer by childproofing against entrapment, such as using a refrigerator bar or lock to prevent access to appliances. Doors that lead to spaces containing dangerous equipment, such as utility rooms and campers, should be kept closed and locked. Proper supervision of children will also reduce opportunities for entrapment.

== See also ==
- Death by vending machine
- Entrapment in automobile trunks
- Television tip-over
