= Abolitionism (disambiguation) =

Abolitionism is the movement to end human slavery.

Abolitionism may also refer to:

- Abolitionism (animal rights), a movement to end the property status of animals
- Abolitionism (abortion), a philosophy of the anti-abortion movement to abolish abortion
- Copyright abolition, a movement to abolish state granted monopolies over intellectual works
- Abolitionism (prostitution), a movement to abolish state regulation of prostitution, seen as a form of slavery of women
- Abolitionism (capital punishment), a movement to abolish the death penalty within the capital punishment debate
- Abolitionism (transhumanism), a current within the transhumanist movement, which seeks to abolish all pain and suffering in all sentient beings
- Border abolitionism, a movement to abolish borders between countries
- Gender abolitionism (in gender studies, radical feminism or postgenderism), a movement to abolish gender
- Market abolitionism, a belief that the market, in the economic sense, should be eliminated from society
- Monarchy abolition, a movement to remove monarchs and more broadly, royal families from positions of political power
- Prison abolition, a movement to end incarceration as a means to address harm
- Total abolition, a political philosophy also known as veganarchism (veganism and anarchism)
- Police abolition movement

== See also ==
- Abolition (disambiguation)
