= Abolition =

Abolition refers to the act of putting an end to something by law, and may refer to:

- Abolitionism, abolition of slavery
- Abolition of the death penalty, also called capital punishment
- Abolition of monarchy
- Abolition of nuclear weapons
- Abolition of prisons
- Abolition of ICE
- Police abolition movement
- Abolition of suffering
- Abolitionism (animal rights), related to veganism
- Abolition of time zones
- Abolition of borders

== See also ==
- Abolition of slavery timeline
- Abolitionism (disambiguation)
