= Abortion abolitionism =

Absolutist anti-abortion philosophy

Abortion abolitionism is an anti-abortion philosophy, often in disagreement with mainstream anti-abortion positions and organizations that are largely incrementalistic. Abortion abolitionists are in opposition to incrementalism, often opposing or criticizing laws that fall short of the complete abolition and prohibition of abortion. Abortion abolitionists have adopted the term "abolitionist" to separate themselves from being classified as simply "pro-life" and to make a moral comparison between abortion and slavery.

== Philosophy ==
Abortion abolitionists argue that the Universal Declaration of Human Rights and—in regards to the United States—the Fourteenth Amendment to the United States Constitution entitles embryos and fetuses to equal protection from murder, which they believe abortion (the deliberate termination of a human pregnancy) to be. In accordance with this view, abortion abolitionists support the criminalization of abortion to be similar or equal to the criminalization of murder of people after birth. This includes the belief that abortion patients ought to be prosecuted for intentionally procuring or inducing an abortion, something that the mainstream anti-abortion movement opposes.

In calling themselves "abolitionists", those in this movement intend to compare the rights of embryos and fetuses to the rights of chattel slaves, arguing that both groups of individuals are people that have been dehumanized by society. To defend such claim against widespread criticism, abolitionists say that the historic abolitionist position on slavery was once also seen as radical and unpopular.

Abortion abolitionists often oppose or criticize laws that fall short of the complete abolition of abortion. Arguing that the "pro-life movement" is reformist, abortion abolitionists believe that abortion ought to be abolished, not simply restricted or regulated. Abolitionists oppose exceptions for rape and incest. Abolitionists also tend to oppose in vitro fertilization, citing the frequent disposal of excess embryos.

== Activities ==
Abortion abolitionists tend to be a vocal minority within the anti-abortion movement. Many abolitionists are strong critics of Donald Trump, the Republican Party, and mainstream anti-abortion groups who they argue are too soft on and complicit for abortion.

In May 2022, a law was proposed in the Louisiana State Legislature that would enshrine equal protection to embryos and fetuses, and it would have punished abortion under homicide laws. This law included provisions that allowed for women to be prosecuted for procuring abortions, something most mainstream anti-abortion groups don't support. More than 70 mainstream anti-abortion organizations signed a letter that opposed the measure, saying that it was their “longstanding policy that abortion-vulnerable women should not be treated as criminals.”

== Groups ==
The majority of abolitionist organizations within the United States are Christian-based. Some secular organizations, however, also describe themselves as abolitionist. Groups calling themselves abolitionist include the Oklahoma-based organization Abolitionists Rising, Abolish Human Abortion, and Operation Save America. These groups have gained political support following overturning of Roe v. Wade in 2022. Some abolitionist groups filed amicus curiae briefs in support of the overturning of the decision. As of 2023, state legislators in almost 20 U.S. states had introduced abortion abolitionist bills that permit the criminalization of women who procure abortions. There are abolitionist campaign groups in 21 states, and abolition of abortion is included in the platform of the Republican Party of Texas.

== Criticism ==
Abortion abolitionism is criticized by both the abortion-rights movement and mainstream anti-abortion groups.

Proponents of abortion rights criticize abortion abolitionists for attempting to co-opt the imagery of the civil rights movement. Abortion abolitionism has been described as extreme and radical due to its support for the criminalization of women who obtain abortions.

Mainstream anti-abortion activists also criticize abortion abolitionists for what they see as a hindrance to passing "pro-life legislation." They see the abolitionist position as a threat to gaining support and winning elections, and they instead favor an incrementalistic approach to abortion that involves compromise. Many abolitionists distance themselves from being described as "pro-life" in order to emphasize their dissent from the mainstream movement.
