= Lourenço da Silva de Mendouça =

Angolan Catholic abolitionist (1640s–1698)

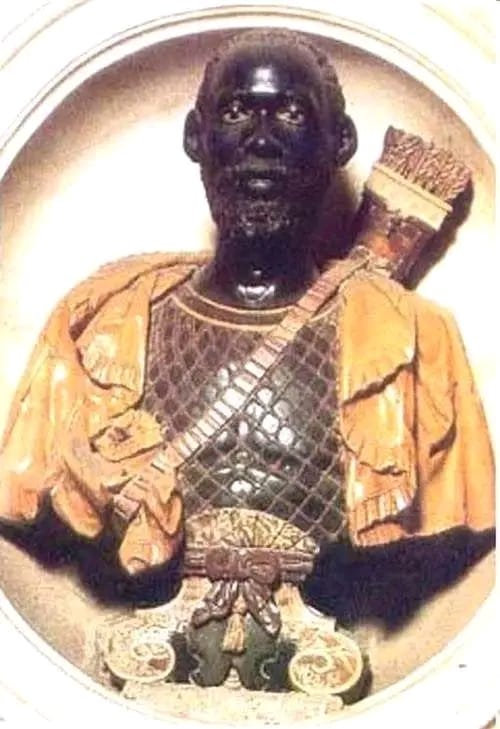
Lourenço da Silva Mendouça

Lourenço da Silva Mendouça (1640s – 1698) was member of the royal family of the Kingdom of Ndongo in what is now Angola. An abolitionist, he was likely the first person to successfully convince authorities to end slavery in Europe. A Catholic, his dealings were mostly with Church authorities and those with whom they were associated.

His historical achievement had been largely forgotten and obfuscated until work by the historian Richard Gray in the 1980s and 1990s (who initially only had three or so sources to rely on), and the scholar José Lingna Nafafé, who discovered many new sources and details of the history of his life in the 2010s—including confirmation that he was an African prince.

== Biography ==
Lourenço da Silva Mendouça was a member of the Mbundu people from the city of Pedras. His date of birth is unknown, but he may have been 22 or 23 years old when he left Angola in 1671.

His grandfather, known as either King Hari or Philipe I, was the second ruler of the Kingdom of Pungo a Ndongo in what is now central Angola from 1626 to 1664, at the time a usurper nation broken off the Kingdom of Ndongo ruled by the war queen Nzinga and a vassal kingdom subject to the Portuguese Empire. He was succeeded by Dom João, the uncle of Mendouça. Dom João refused the annual tax of 100 slaves demanded by the colonisers, known as baculamento, and declared war against the Portuguese. This war was subsequently lost, and the victorious Portuguese decided to send Mendonça and much of his family in exile to the Colonial Brazil in 1671. Compared to most Africans there, Mendonça had a much less demanding life. The family first spent 18 months in Salvador, Bahia, before being moved to Rio de Janeiro in 1673. The local colonial authorities, however, grew fearful of the possibility the princes might flee their control and join the powerful Quilombo dos Palmares, a free nation of maroons which had been established in the interior and was nominally at war with Portugal. Thus it was decided later that same year to send the Prince and his family to Portugal, and split them up.

Mendonça was sent to the Convent of Vilar de Frades, in Braga, where he studied for three or four years, before moving to Lisbon. There were a large number of Africans living in Portugal at the time, both slaves and free people. Lisbon had a population which was 10% black. Many of these people had organised into various different black Catholic confraternities - charitable lay societies which organised education, religious services, medical help and buying freedom for Africans. In 1681 (or 1682) he was appointed the procurator-general of the Confraternity of Our Lady, Star of the Negroes, a group also represented in Brazil and Portuguese Africa.

Over the next few years he began to work on his arguments against slavery, travelling to the Royal Court of Madrid in Toledo, Spain, in late 1682, hosted and supported by Dom Carlos II, King of Spain and the Archbishop of Toledo, Luis Manuel Fernández de Portocarrero y de Guzman. He spent 18 months here, before journeying across Europe to the Vatican curia in Rome, arriving in 1684. Here he launched a criminal case against the (Catholic) European nations involved in the transatlantic slave trade at the time -in any case Spain, Portugal, the Papal States and various nations now part of Italy, accusing them of crimes against humanity. He had collected support over the years from the different black confraternities of Europe, and was also supported by a number of missionaries of the Order of Friars Minor Capuchin. His petitions presented a first-hand account of the cruelties inflicted by slavery.

His efforts convinced the Sacred Congregation for the Propagation of the Faith and led directly to the March 20th, 1686 condemnation of slavery by Pope Innocent XI. He was given a coat of arms by the Vatican Nuncio in Portugal, Gasper de Mesquita, inscribed with the slogan morir es lo mas cierto, death is certain. This was derived from the Latin saying mors certa est, at eius hora incerta est, which describes the human condition: gods are immortal, animals are unaware of their mortality, only humans suffer the knowledge of death.

Mendouça died in 1698.
