= Anti-Slavery Society =

Anti-Slavery Society was a name used by various abolitionist groups including:

== United Kingdom ==
- Society for Effecting the Abolition of the Slave Trade (1787–1807?), also referred to as the Abolition Society
- Anti-Slavery Society (1823–1838), full name Society for the Mitigation and Gradual Abolition of Slavery Throughout the British Dominions
- Anti-Slavery International (1839–present), founded as the British and Foreign Anti-Slavery Society

== United States ==
- American Anti-Slavery Society (1833–1870)
- Anti-Slavery League of Indiana
- Boston Female Anti-Slavery Society (founded 1833)
- The Concord Female Anti-Slavery Society (founded 1837)
- Philadelphia Female Anti-Slavery Society (founded 1833)
- Fall River Female Anti-Slavery Society (founded 1835)
- Ladies’ New York City Anti-Slavery Society (founded 1835)
- Massachusetts Anti-Slavery Society (founded 1835)
- Ohio Anti-Slavery Society (founded 1835)
- Anti-Slavery Convention of American Women (founded 1837)
- New York State Anti-Slavery Society, first meeting held in Utica October 19, 1836 (History of slavery in New York (state))
- Pennsylvania Anti-Slavery Society (founded 1838)
- American and Foreign Anti-Slavery Society (founded 1840)
- Neel's [Neil's] Creek Anti-Slavery Society in Indiana with members including Lyman Hoyt

== Others ==
- Société des amis des Noirs, French abolitionist society founded 1788
- Belgian Anti-Slavery Society, founded 1888

== See also ==
- Category:American abolitionist organizations
- Birmingham Ladies Society for the Relief of Negro Slaves, also known as the Ladies Anti-Slavery Society
- World Anti-Slavery Convention (1840)
