= Abolitionism =

Movement to end slavery

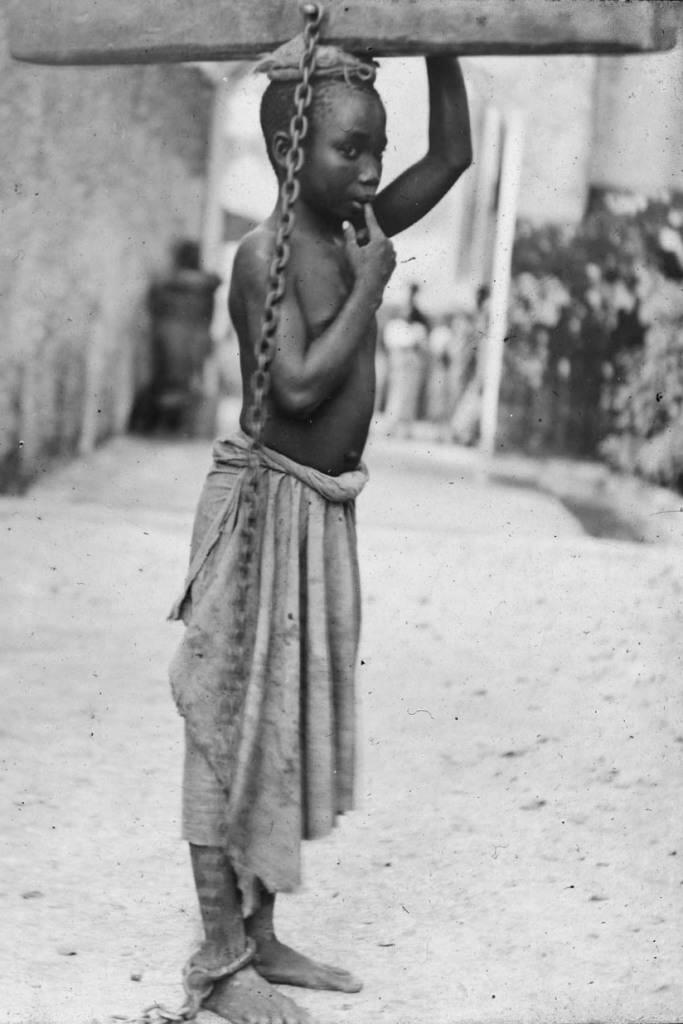
Photograph of a slave boy in the Sultanate of Zanzibar. 'An Arab master's punishment for a slight offence.' c. 1890. From at least the 1860s onwards, photography was a powerful weapon in the abolitionist arsenal.

Abolitionism, or the abolitionist movement, is the political movement to end slavery and liberate enslaved individuals around the world. It gained momentum in the western world in the late 18th and 19th centuries.

The first country to fully outlaw slavery was France in 1315, though it was later used in its colonies. The first country to abolish and punish slavery for indigenous people was Spain with the New Laws in 1542.

Under the actions of Toyotomi Hideyoshi, chattel slavery was abolished across Japan since 1590, though other forms of forced labor were used during World War II. The first and only country to self-liberate from slavery was a former French colony, Haiti, as a result of the Revolution of 1791–1804. The British abolitionist movement began in the late 18th century, and the 1772 Somersett case established that slavery did not exist in English law. In 1807, the slave trade was made illegal throughout the British Empire, though existing slaves in British colonies were not liberated until the Slavery Abolition Act 1833. In the United States, Pennsylvania and Vermont were the first states to abolish slavery, Vermont in 1777 and Pennsylvania in 1780 (Vermont did not join the Union until 1791). By 1804, the rest of the northern states had abolished slavery, but it remained legal in southern states. By 1808, the United States outlawed the importation of slaves and in 1865 outlawed slavery except as a punishment.

In Eastern Europe, groups organized to abolish the enslavement of the Roma in Wallachia and Moldavia between 1843 and 1855, and to emancipate the serfs in Russia in 1861. The United States would pass the 13th Amendment in December 1865 after having just fought a bloody Civil War, ending slavery "except as a punishment for crime". In 1888, Brazil became the last country in the Americas to outlaw slavery. As the Empire of Japan annexed Asian countries, from the late 19th century onwards, archaic institutions including slavery were abolished in those countries.

During the 20th century, the League of Nations founded a number of commissions, Temporary Slavery Commission (1924–1926), Committee of Experts on Slavery (1932) and the Advisory Committee of Experts on Slavery (1934–1939), which conducted international investigations of the institution of slavery and created international treaties, such as the 1926 Slavery Convention, to eradicate the institution worldwide.

In 1948, slavery was declared illegal in the United Nations' Universal Declaration of Human Rights. By this time, the Arab world was the only region in the world where institutional chattel slavery was still legal. Slavery in Saudi Arabia, slavery in Yemen and slavery in Dubai were abolished in 1962–1963, with slavery in Oman following in 1970.

Mauritania is the latest country to officially abolish slavery, with a presidential decree in 1981. Today, child and adult slavery and forced labor are illegal in almost all countries, as well as being against international law, but human trafficking for labor and for sexual slavery continues to affect tens of millions of adults and children.

== Europe ==
=== France ===
==== Early abolition in metropolitan France ====
Balthild of Chelles, herself a former slave, queen consort of Neustria and Burgundy by marriage to Clovis II, became regent in 657 since the king, her son Chlothar III, was only five years old. At some unknown date during her rule, she abolished the trade of slaves, although not slavery. Moreover, her (and contemporaneous Saint Eligius') favorite charity was to buy and free slaves, especially children. Slavery started to dwindle and would be superseded by serfdom.

In 1315, Louis X, king of France, published a decree proclaiming that "France signifies freedom" and that any slave setting foot on French soil should be freed. This prompted subsequent governments to circumscribe slavery in the overseas colonies.

Some cases of African slaves freed by setting foot on French soil were recorded such as the example of a Norman slave merchant who tried to sell slaves in Bordeaux in 1571. He was arrested and his slaves were freed according to a declaration of the Parlement of Guyenne which stated that slavery was intolerable in France, although it is a misconception that there were 'no slaves in France'; thousands of African slaves were present in France during the 18th century. Born into slavery in Saint Domingue, Thomas-Alexandre Dumas became free when his father brought him to France in 1776.

==== Code Noir and Age of Enlightenment ====
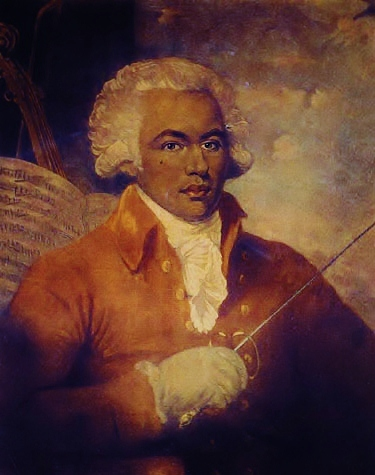
The Chevalier de Saint-Georges, known as the "Black Mozart", was, by his social position, and by his political involvement, a figurehead of free blacks.

As in other New World colonies, the French relied on the Atlantic slave trade for labor for their sugar cane plantations in their Caribbean colonies; the French West Indies. In addition, French colonists in Louisiane in North America held slaves, particularly in the South around New Orleans, where they established sugarcane plantations.

Louis XIV's Code Noir regulated the slave trade and institution in the colonies. It gave unparalleled rights to slaves. It included the right to marry, gather publicly or take Sundays off. Although the Code Noir authorized and codified cruel corporal punishment against slaves under certain conditions, it forbade slave owners to torture them or to separate families. It also demanded enslaved Africans receive instruction in the Catholic faith, implying that Africans were human beings endowed with a soul, a fact French law did not admit until then. It resulted in a far higher percentage of Black people being free in 1830 (13.2% in Louisiana compared to 0.8% in Mississippi). They were on average exceptionally literate, with a significant number of them owning businesses, properties, and even slaves. Other free people of colour, such as Julien Raimond, spoke out against slavery.

During the Age of Enlightenment, many philosophers wrote pamphlets against slavery and its moral and economical justifications, including Montesquieu in The Spirit of the Laws (1748) and Denis Diderot in the Encyclopédie. In 1788, Jacques Pierre Brissot founded the Society of the Friends of the Blacks (Société des Amis des Noirs) to work for the abolition of slavery. After the Revolution, on 4 April 1792, France granted free people of colour full citizenship.

The slave revolt, in the largest Caribbean French colony of Saint-Domingue in 1791, was the beginning of what became the Haitian Revolution led by formerly enslaved people like Georges Biassou, Toussaint L'Ouverture, and Jean-Jacques Dessalines. The rebellion swept through the north of the colony, and with it came freedom to thousands of enslaved blacks, but also violence and death. In 1793, French Civil Commissioners in St. Domingue and abolitionists, Léger-Félicité Sonthonax and Étienne Polverel, issued the first emancipation proclamation of the modern world (Decree of 16 Pluviôse An II). The Convention sent them to safeguard the allegiance of the population to revolutionary France. The proclamation resulted in crucial military strategy as it gradually brought most of the black troops into the French fold and kept the colony under the French flag for most of the conflict. The connection with France lasted until blacks and free people of colour formed L'armée indigène in 1802 to resist Napoleon's Expédition de Saint-Domingue. Victory over the French in the decisive Battle of Vertières finally led to independence and the creation of present Haiti in 1804.

==== First general abolition of slavery (1794) ====
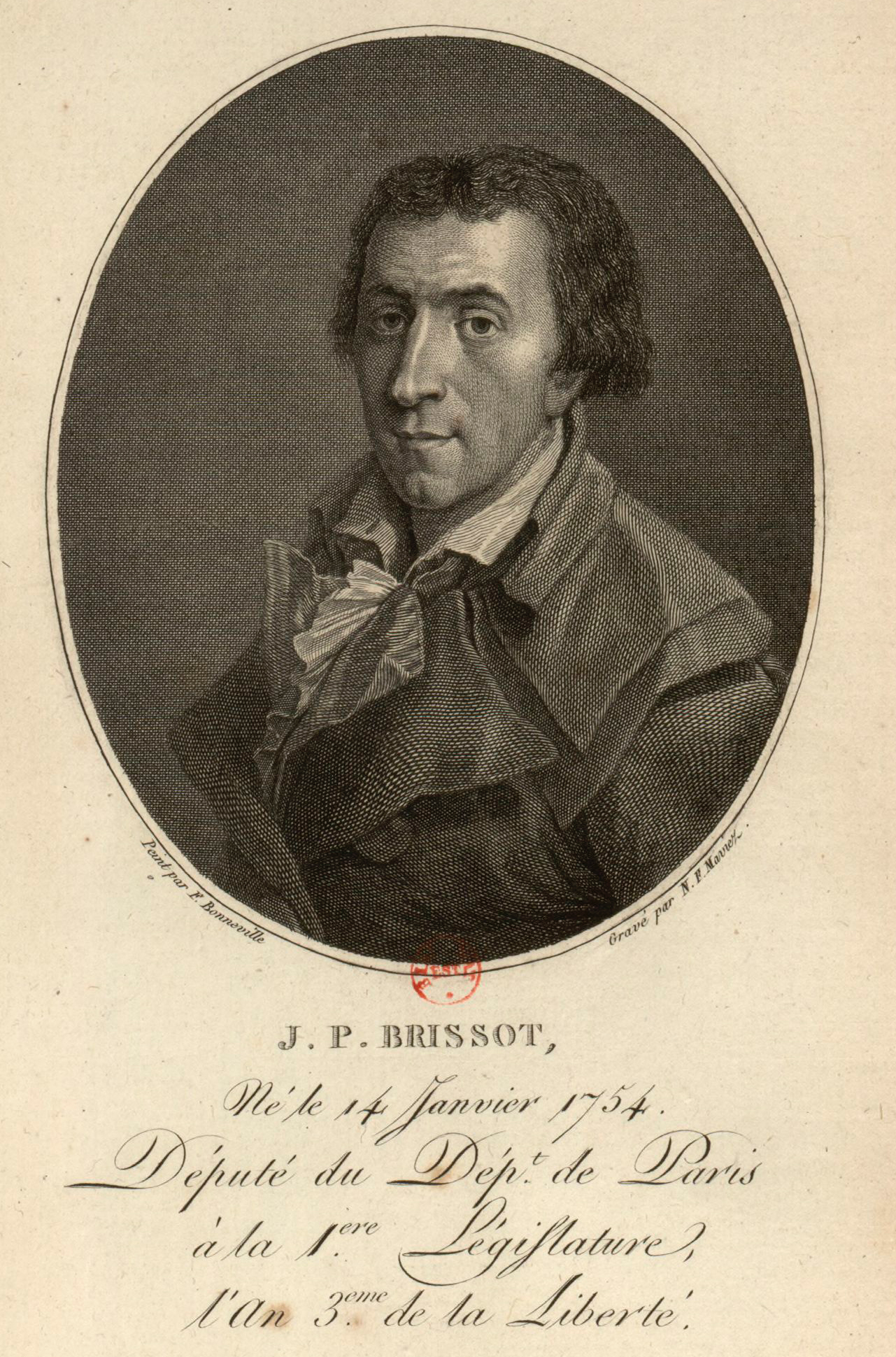
Jacques Pierre Brissot (1754–1793), who organized the Society of the Friends of the Blacks in 1788

The convention, the first elected Assembly of the First Republic (1792–1804), on 4 February 1794, under the leadership of Maximilien Robespierre, abolished slavery in law in France and its colonies. Abbé Grégoire and the Society of the Friends of the Blacks were part of the abolitionist movement, which had laid important groundwork in building anti-slavery sentiment in the metropole. The first article of the law stated that "Slavery was abolished" in the French colonies, while the second article stated that "slave-owners would be indemnified" with financial compensation for the value of their slaves. The French constitution passed in 1795 included in the declaration of the Rights of Man that slavery was abolished.

==== Re-establishment of slavery in the colonies (1802) ====
During the French Revolutionary Wars, French slave-owners joined the counter-revolution en masse and, through the Whitehall Accord, they threatened to move the French Caribbean colonies to British control, as Great Britain still allowed slavery. Fearing secession from these islands, successfully lobbied by planters and concerned about revenues from the West Indies, and influenced by the slaveholder family of his wife, Napoleon Bonaparte decided to re-establish slavery after becoming First Consul. He promulgated the law of 20 May 1802 and sent military governors and troops to the colonies to impose it.

On 10 May 1802, Colonel Delgrès launched a rebellion in Guadeloupe against Napoleon's representative, General Richepanse. The rebellion was repressed, and slavery was re-established.

==== Abolition of slavery in Haiti (1804) ====
The news of the Law of 4 February 1794 that abolished slavery in France and its colonies and the revolution led by Colonel Delgrès sparked another wave of rebellion in Saint-Domingue. From 1802 Napoleon sent more than 20,000 troops to the island, two-thirds died, mostly from yellow fever.

Seeing the failure of the Saint-Domingue expedition, in 1803 Napoleon decided to sell the Louisiana Territory to the United States.

The French governments initially refused to recognize Haïti. It forced the nation to pay a substantial amount of reparations (which it could ill afford) for losses during the revolution and did not recognize its government until 1825.

France was a signatory to the first multilateral treaty for the suppression of the slave trade, the Treaty for the Suppression of the African Slave Trade (1841), but the king, Louis Philippe I, declined to ratify it.

==== Second abolition (1848) ====
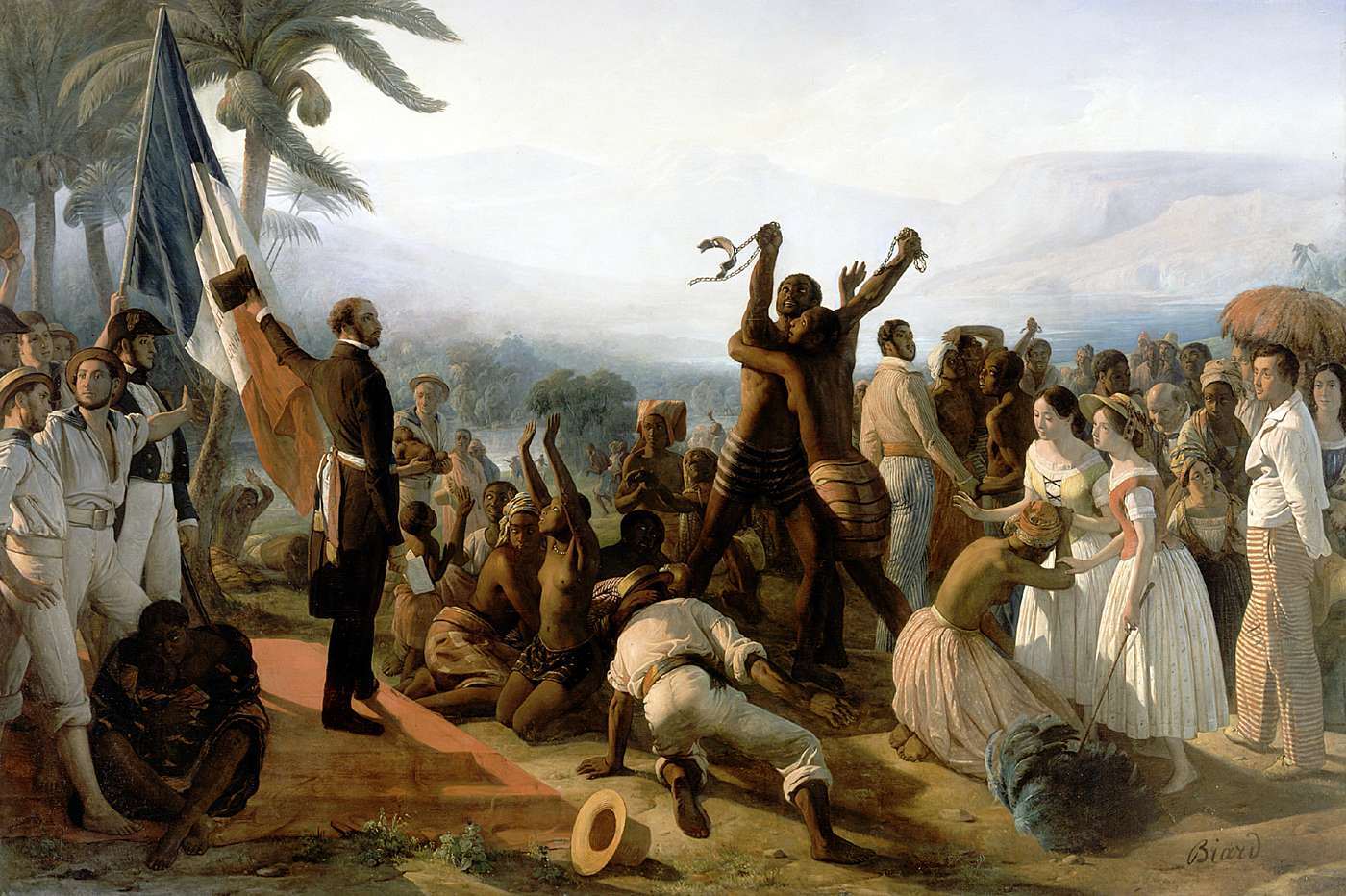
Proclamation of the Abolition of Slavery in the French Colonies, 27 April 1848, by Biard (1849)

On 27 April 1848, under the Second Republic (1848–1852), the decree-law written by Victor Schœlcher abolished slavery in the remaining colonies. The state bought the slaves from the colons (white colonists; Békés in Creole), and then freed them.

==== Final abolition (1903) and subsequent events ====
At about the same time, France started colonizing Africa and had gained possession of much of West Africa by 1900. In 1905, the French abolished slavery in most of French West Africa. The French also attempted to abolish Tuareg slavery following the Kaocen Revolt. In the region of the Sahel, slavery has long persisted.

The abolition wasn't strictly put in place. Several French territories kept practising slavery until 1904 as was the case in Senegal or 1894 in Soudan. The abolition was not strictly enforced.

Passed on 10 May 2001, the Taubira law officially acknowledges slavery and the Atlantic slave trade as a crime against humanity. 10 May was chosen as the day dedicated to recognition of the crime of slavery.

=== Great Britain ===
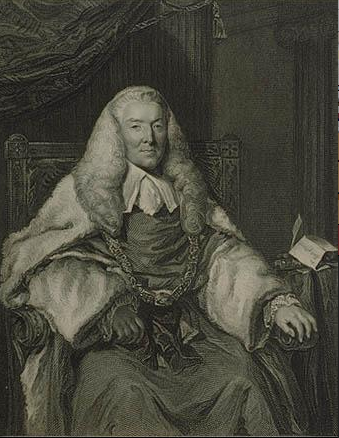
Lord Mansfield (1705–1793), whose opinion in Somerset's Case (1772) was widely taken to have held that there was no basis in law for slavery in England

==== Overview ====
James Oglethorpe was among the first to articulate the Enlightenment case against slavery, banning it in the Province of Georgia on humanitarian grounds, and arguing against it in Parliament. Soon after Oglethorpe's death in 1785, Sharp and More united with William Wilberforce and others in forming the Clapham Sect.

The Somersett case in 1772, in which a fugitive slave was freed with the judgement that slavery did not exist under English common law, helped launch the British movement to abolish slavery. Though anti-slavery sentiments were widespread by the late 18th century, many colonies and emerging nations continued to use slave labor: Dutch, French, British, Spanish, and Portuguese territories in the West Indies, South America, and the Southern United States. After the American Revolution established the United States, many Loyalists who fled the Northern United States immigrated to the British province of Quebec, bringing an English majority population as well as many slaves, leading the province to ban the institution in 1793 (see Slavery in Canada). In 1787, the Society for Effecting the Abolition of the Slave Trade was formed in London.

==== Development ====
The last known form of enforced servitude of adults (villeinage) had disappeared in England by the beginning of the 17th century. In 1569 a court considered the case of Cartwright, who had bought a slave from Russia. The court ruled English law could not recognize slavery, as it was never established officially. This ruling was overshadowed by later developments; it was upheld in 1700 by the Lord Chief Justice John Holt when he ruled that a slave became free as soon as he arrived in England. During the English Civil Wars of the mid-seventeenth century, sectarian radicals challenged slavery and other threats to personal freedom. Their ideas influenced many antislavery thinkers in the eighteenth century.

In addition to English colonists importing slaves to the North American colonies, by the 18th century, traders began to import slaves from Africa, India and East Asia (where they were trading) to London and Edinburgh to work as personal servants. Men who migrated to the North American colonies often took their East Indian slaves or servants with them, as East Indians have been documented in colonial records.

Some of the first freedom suits, court cases in the British Isles to challenge the legality of slavery, took place in Scotland in 1755 and 1769. The cases were Montgomery v. Sheddan (1755) and Spens v. Dalrymple (1769). Each of the slaves had been baptized in Scotland and challenged the legality of slavery. They set the precedent of legal procedure in British courts that would later lead to successful outcomes for the plaintiffs. In these cases, deaths of the plaintiff and defendant, respectively, brought an end before court decisions.

African slaves were not bought or sold in London but were brought by masters from other areas. Together with people from other nations, especially non-Christian, Africans were considered foreigners, not able to be English subjects. At the time, England had no naturalization procedure. The African slaves' legal status was unclear until 1772 and Somersett's Case, when the fugitive slave James Somersett forced a decision by the courts. Somersett had escaped, and his master, Charles Steuart, had him captured and imprisoned on board a ship, intending to ship him to Jamaica to be resold into slavery. While in London, Somersett had been baptized; three godparents issued a writ of habeas corpus. As a result, Lord Mansfield, Chief Justice of the Court of the King's Bench, had to judge whether Somersett's abduction was lawful or not under English common law. No legislation had ever been passed to establish slavery in England. The case received national attention, and five advocates supported the action on behalf of Somersett.

In his judgment of 22 June 1772, Mansfield declared:

The state of slavery is of such a nature that it is incapable of being introduced on any reasons, moral or political, but only by positive law, which preserves its force long after the reasons, occasions, and time itself from whence it was created, is erased from memory. It is so odious, that nothing can be suffered to support it, but positive law. Whatever inconveniences, therefore, may follow from a decision, I cannot say this case is allowed or approved by the law of England; and therefore the black must be discharged.

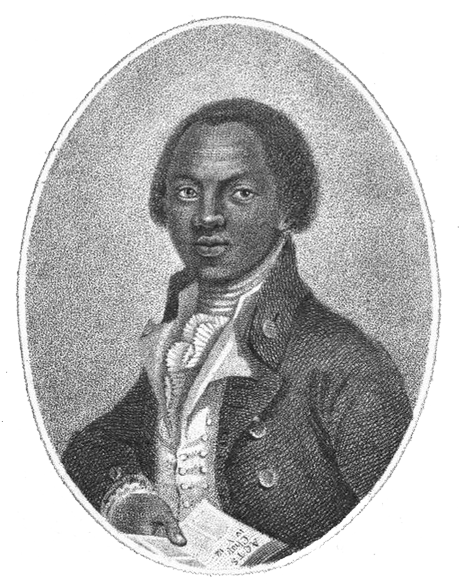
Olaudah Equiano was a member of an abolitionist group of prominent free Africans living in Britain, and he was active among leaders of the anti-slave trade movement in the 1780s.

Although the exact legal implications of the judgement are unclear when analysed by lawyers, the judgement was generally taken at the time to have determined that slavery did not exist under English common law and was thus prohibited in England. The decision did not apply to the British overseas territories; by then, for example, the American colonies had established slavery by positive laws. Somersett's case became a significant part of the common law of slavery in the English-speaking world and it helped launch the movement to abolish slavery.

After reading about Somersett's Case, Joseph Knight, an enslaved African who had been purchased by his master John Wedderburn in Jamaica and brought to Scotland, left him. Married and with a child, he filed a freedom suit, on the grounds that he could not be held as a slave in Great Britain. In the case of Knight v. Wedderburn (1778), Wedderburn said that Knight owed him "perpetual servitude". The Court of Session of Scotland ruled against him, saying that chattel slavery was not recognized under the law of Scotland, and slaves could seek court protection to leave a master or avoid being forcibly removed from Scotland to be returned to slavery in the colonies.

The 1840 Anti-Slavery Convention at Exeter Hall

But at the same time, legally mandated, hereditary slavery of Scots persons in Scotland had existed from 1606 and continued until 1799, when colliers and salters were emancipated by an act of the Parliament of Great Britain (39 Geo. 3 c. 56). Skilled workers, they were restricted to a place and could be sold with the works. A prior law enacted in 1775 (15 Geo. 3 c. 28) was intended to end what the act referred to as "a state of slavery and bondage", but that was ineffective, necessitating the 1799 act.

In the 1776 book The Wealth of Nations, Adam Smith argued for the abolition of slavery on economic grounds. Smith pointed out that slavery incurred security, housing, and food costs that the use of free labor would not, and opined that free workers would be more productive because they would have personal economic incentives to work harder. The death rate (and thus repurchase cost) of slaves was also high, and people are less productive when not allowed to choose the type of work they prefer, are illiterate, and are forced to live and work in miserable and unhealthy conditions. The free labor markets and international free trade that Smith preferred would also result in different prices and allocations that Smith believed would be more efficient and productive for consumers.

==== British Empire ====
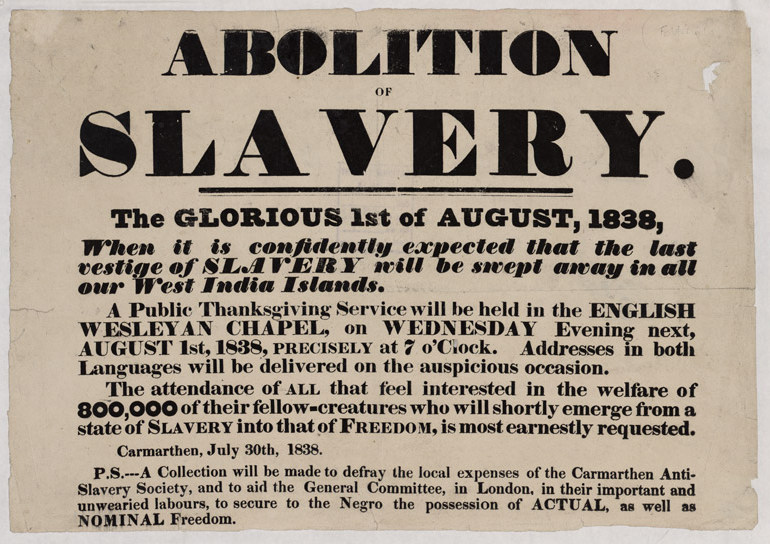
A poster advertising a special chapel service to celebrate the Abolition of Slavery in 1838

Prior to the American Revolution, there were few significant initiatives in the American colonies that led to the abolitionist movement. Some Quakers were active. Benjamin Kent was the lawyer who took on most of the cases of slaves suing their masters for personal illegal enslavement. He was the first lawyer to successfully establish a slave's freedom. In addition, Brigadier General Samuel Birch created the Book of Negroes, to establish which slaves were free after the war.

In 1783, an anti-slavery movement began among the British public to end slavery throughout the British Empire.

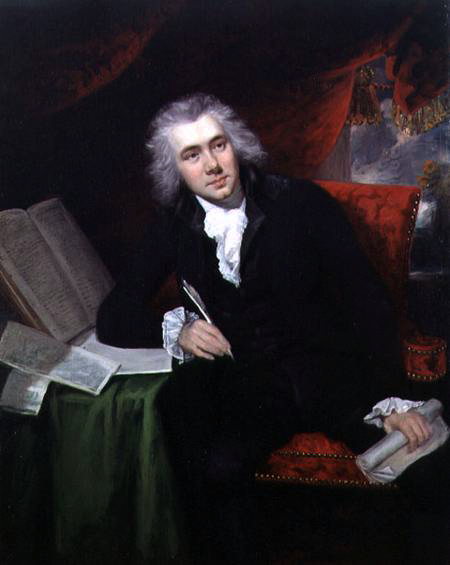
William Wilberforce (1759–1833), politician and philanthropist who was a leader of the movement to abolish the slave trade

After the formation of the Committee for the Abolition of the Slave Trade in 1787, William Wilberforce led the cause of abolition through the parliamentary campaign. Thomas Clarkson became the group's most prominent researcher, gathering vast amounts of data on the trade. One aspect of abolitionism during this period was the effective use of images such as the famous Josiah Wedgwood "Am I Not A Man and a Brother?" anti-slavery medallion of 1787. Clarkson described the medallion as "promoting the cause of justice, humanity and freedom". The 1792 Slave Trade Bill passed the House of Commons mangled and mutilated by the modifications and amendments of Pitt, it lay for years, in the House of Lords. Biographer William Hague considers the unfinished abolition of the slave trade to be Pitt's greatest failure. The Slave Trade Act 1807 was passed by the British Parliament on 25 March 1807, making the slave trade illegal throughout the British Empire. Britain used its influence to coerce other countries to agree to treaties to end their slave trade and allow the Royal Navy to seize their slave ships. Britain enforced the abolition of the trade because the act made trading slaves within British territories illegal. However, the act repealed the Amelioration Act 1798 which attempted to improve conditions for slaves. The end of the slave trade did not end slavery as a whole. Slavery was still a common practice.

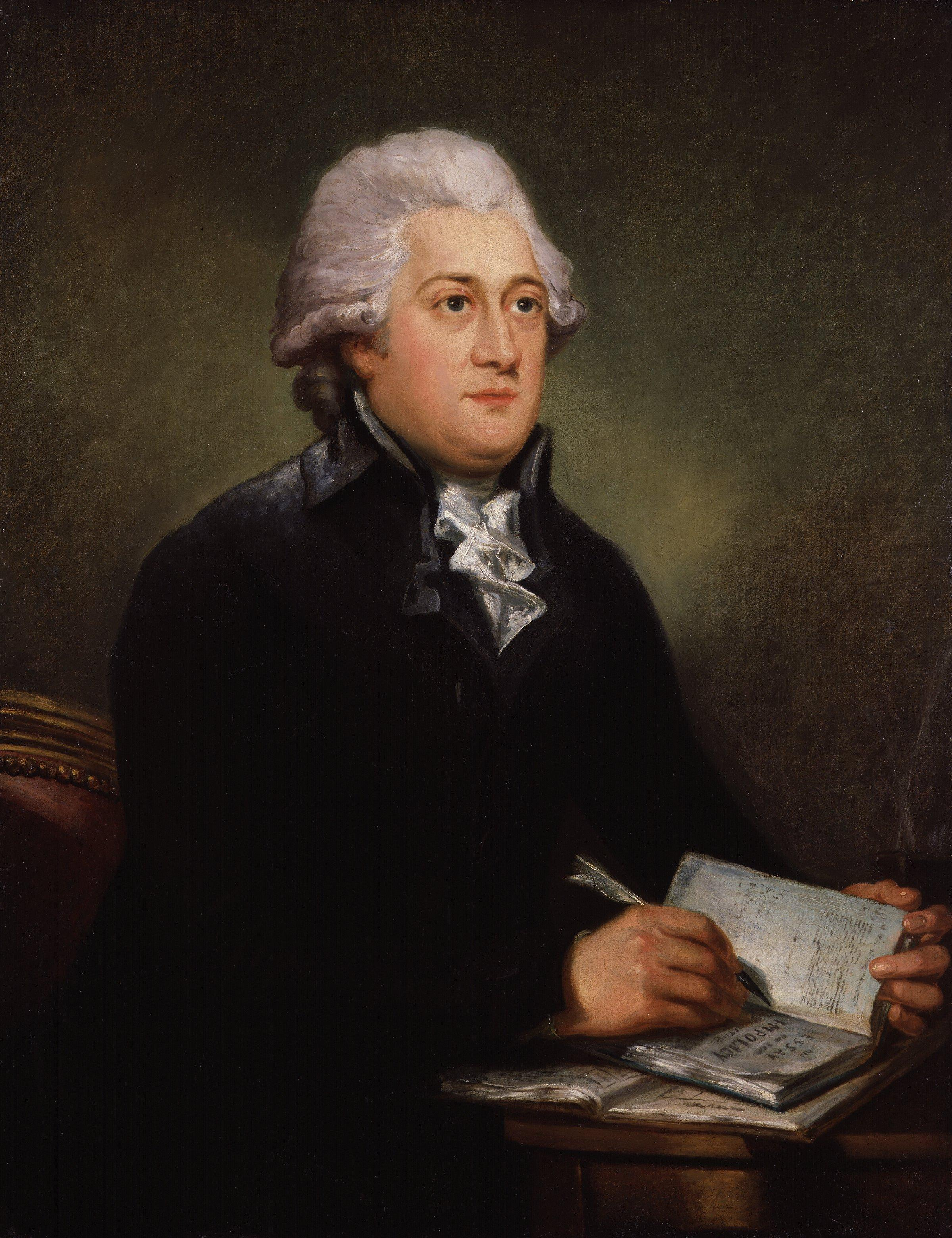
Thomas Clarkson was the key speaker at the British and Foreign Anti-Slavery Society's (today known as Anti-Slavery International) first conference in London, 1840.

In the 1820s, the abolitionist movement revived to campaign against the institution of slavery itself. In 1823 the first Anti-Slavery Society, the Society for the Mitigation and Gradual Abolition of Slavery Throughout the British Dominions, was founded. Many of its members had previously campaigned against the slave trade. On 28 August 1833, the Slavery Abolition Act 1833 was passed. It purchased the slaves from their masters and paved the way for the abolition of slavery throughout the British Empire by 1838, after which the first Anti-Slavery Society was wound up.

In 1839, the British and Foreign Anti-Slavery Society was formed by Joseph Sturge, which attempted to outlaw slavery worldwide and also to pressure the government to help enforce the suppression of the slave trade by declaring slave traders to be pirates. The world's oldest international human rights organization, it continues today as Anti-Slavery International. Thomas Clarkson was the key speaker at the World Anti-Slavery Convention it held in London in 1840.

=== Moldavia and Wallachia ===
In the principalities of Wallachia and Moldavia, the government held slavery of the Roma (often referred to as Gypsies) as legal at the beginning of the 19th century. The progressive pro-European and anti-Ottoman movement, which gradually gained power in the two principalities, also worked to abolish that slavery. Between 1843 and 1855, the principalities emancipated all of the 250,000 enslaved Roma people.

== The Americas ==
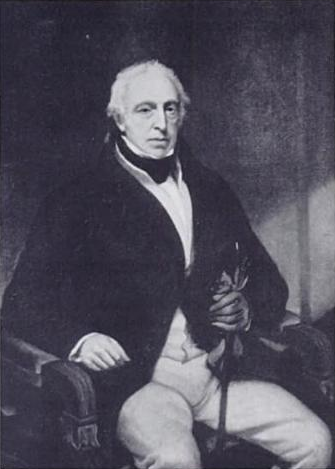
Hugh Elliot was a noted abolitionist. Whilst Governor in the British West Indies, he was reported to be the driving force behind the arrest, trial and execution of a wealthy white planter Arthur Hodge for the murder of a slave.

Bartolomé de las Casas was a 16th-century Spanish Dominican priest, the first resident Bishop of Chiapas (Central America, today Mexico). As a settler in the New World he witnessed and opposed the poor treatment and virtual slavery of the Native Americans by the Spanish colonists, under the encomienda system. He advocated before King Charles V, Holy Roman Emperor on behalf of rights for the natives.

Las Casas for 20 years worked to get African slaves imported to replace natives; African slavery was everywhere and no one talked of ridding the New World of it, though France had abolished slavery in France itself and there was talk in other countries about doing the same. However, Las Casas had a late change of heart, and became an advocate for the Africans in the colonies.

His book, A Short Account of the Destruction of the Indies, contributed to Spanish passage of colonial legislation known as the New Laws of 1542, which abolished native slavery for the first time in European colonial history. It ultimately led to the Valladolid debate, the first European debate about the rights of colonized people.

=== Latin America ===
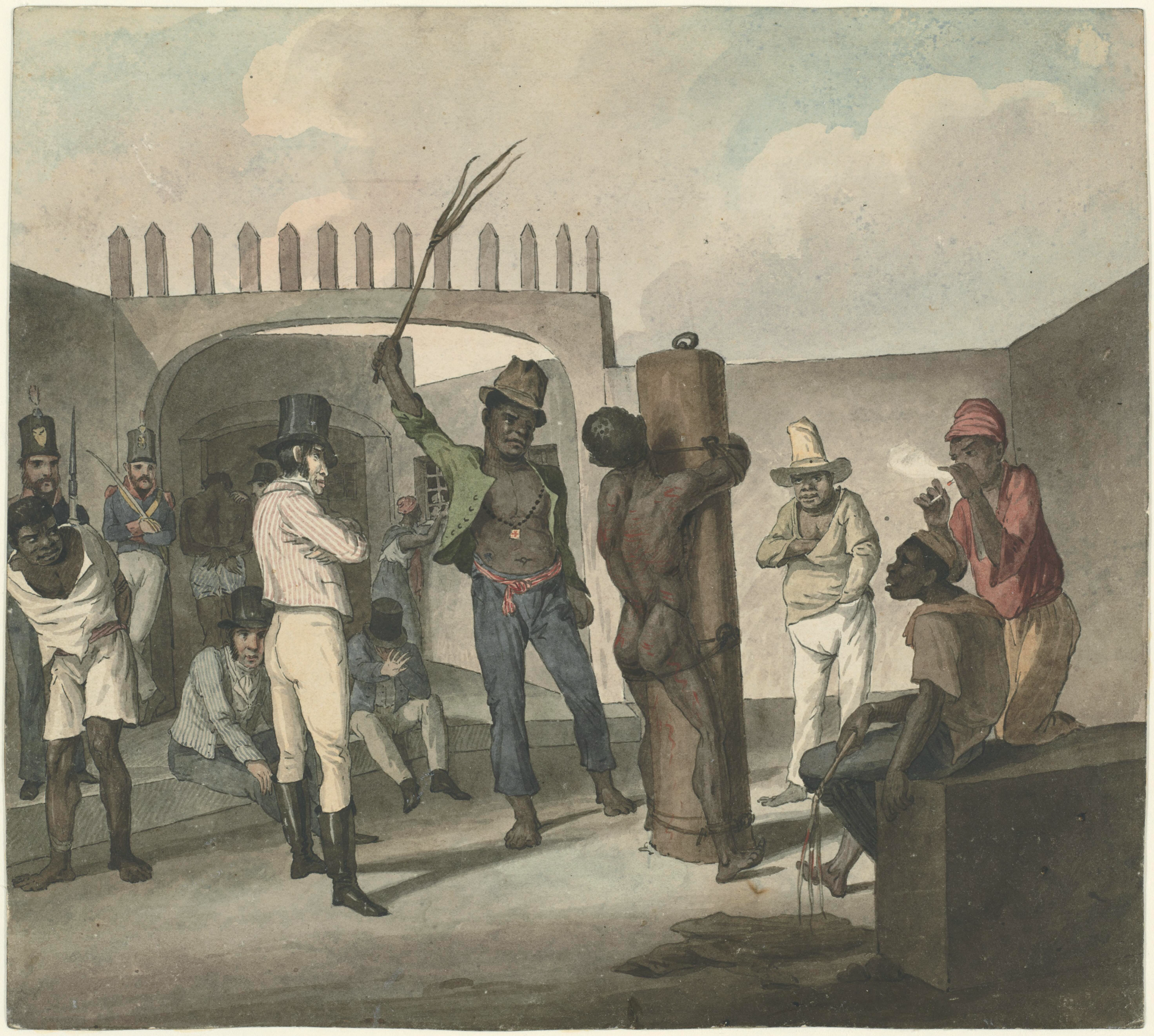
Punishing slaves at Calabouço, in Rio de Janeiro, c. 1822. Brazil in 1888 was the last nation in the Americas to abolish slavery.

During the early 19th century, slavery expanded rapidly in Brazil, Cuba, and the United States, while at the same time the new republics of mainland Spanish America became committed to the gradual abolition of slavery. During the Spanish American wars for independence (1810–1826), slavery was abolished in most of Latin America, though it continued until 1873 in Puerto Rico, 1886 in Cuba, and 1888 in Brazil (where it was abolished by the Lei Áurea, the "Golden Law"). Chile declared freedom of wombs in 1811, followed by the United Provinces of the River Plate in 1813, Colombia and Venezuela in 1821, but without abolishing slavery completely. While Chile abolished slavery in 1823, Argentina did so with the signing of the Argentine Constitution of 1853. Peru abolished slavery in 1854. Colombia abolished slavery in 1851. Slavery was abolished in Uruguay during the Guerra Grande, by both the government of Fructuoso Rivera and the government in exile of Manuel Oribe.

=== Canada ===
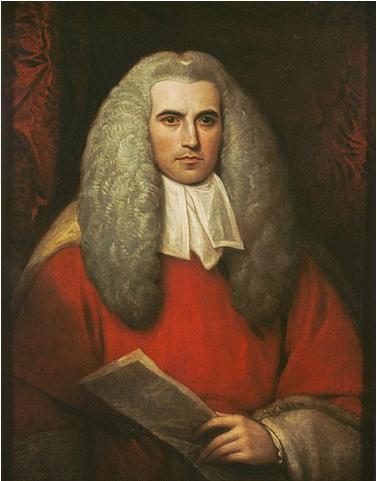
Chief Justice Thomas Andrew Lumisden Strange – helped free Black Nova Scotian slaves.

Throughout the growth of slavery in the American South, Nova Scotia became a destination for black refugees leaving Southern Colonies and United States. While many blacks who arrived in Nova Scotia during the American Revolution were free, others were not. Black slaves also arrived in Nova Scotia as the property of White American Loyalists. In 1772, prior to the American Revolution, Britain determined that slavery could not exist in the British Isles followed by the Knight v. Wedderburn decision in Scotland in 1778. This decision, in turn, influenced the colony of Nova Scotia. In 1788, abolitionist James Drummond MacGregor from Pictou published the first anti-slavery literature in Canada and began purchasing slaves' freedom and chastising his colleagues in the Presbyterian church who owned slaves. In 1790 John Burbidge freed his slaves. Led by Richard John Uniacke, in 1787, 1789 and again on 11 January 1808, the Nova Scotian legislature refused to legalize slavery. Two chief justices, Thomas Andrew Lumisden Strange (1790–1796) and Sampson Salter Blowers (1797–1832) were instrumental in freeing slaves from their owners in Nova Scotia. They were held in high regard in the colony. By the end of the War of 1812 and the arrival of the Black Refugees, there were few slaves left in Nova Scotia. The Slave Trade Act 1807 outlawed the slave trade in the British Empire and the Slavery Abolition Act 1833 outlawed slavery altogether.

With slaves escaping to New York and New England, legislation for gradual emancipation was passed in Upper Canada (1793) and Lower Canada (1803). In Upper Canada, the Act Against Slavery of 1793 was passed by the Assembly under the auspices of John Graves Simcoe. It was the first legislation against slavery in the British Empire. Under its provisions no new slaves could be imported, slaves already in the province would remain enslaved until death, and children born to female slaves would be slaves but must be freed at the age of 25. The last slaves in Canada gained their freedom when slavery was abolished in the entire British Empire by the Slavery Abolition Act 1833.

=== United States ===
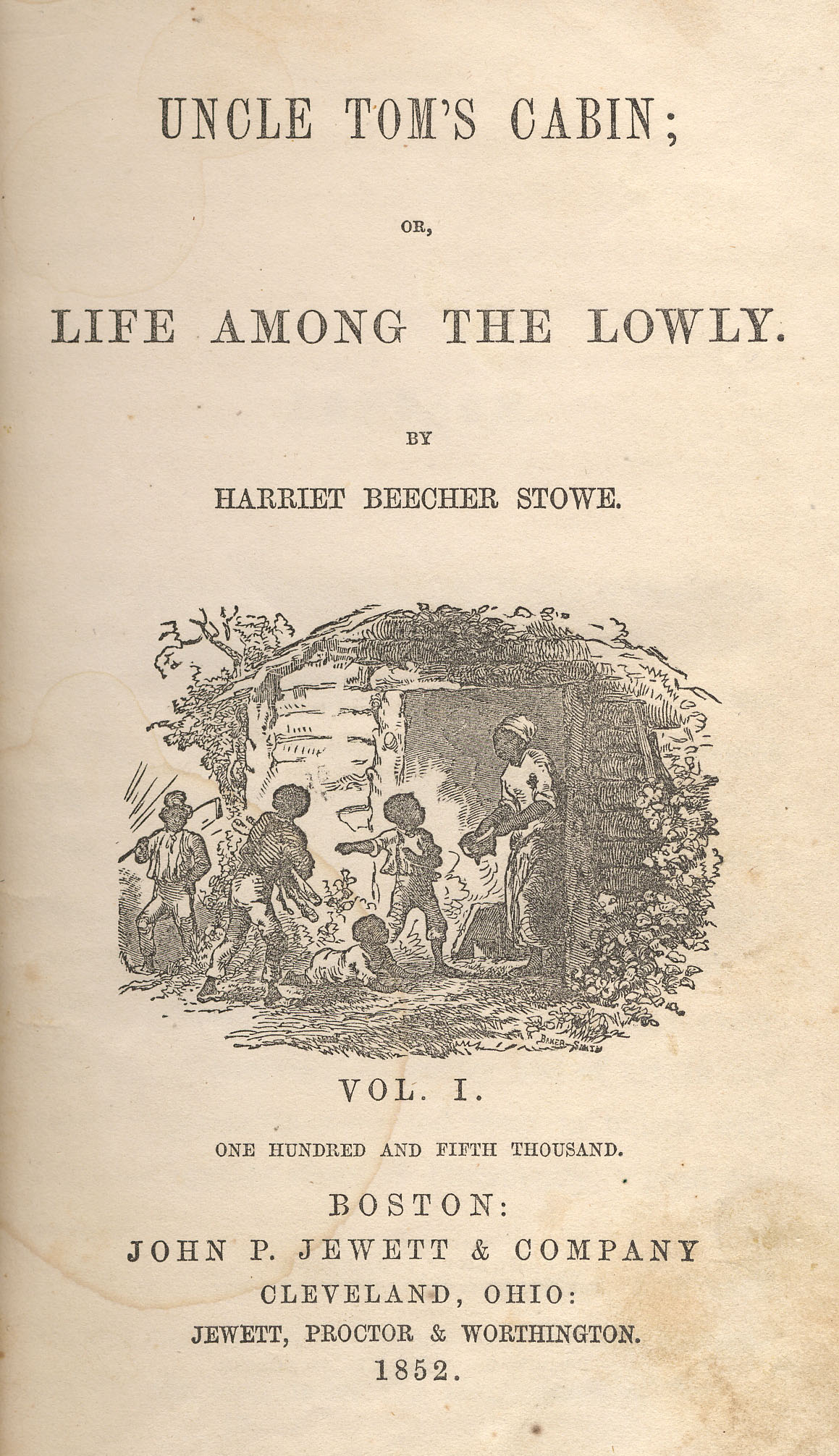
Uncle Tom's Cabin inflamed public opinion in the North and Britain against the evils of slavery.

In his book The Struggle For Equality, historian James M. McPherson defines an abolitionist "as one who before the Civil War had agitated for the immediate, unconditional, and total abolition of slavery in the United States". He does not include antislavery activists such as Abraham Lincoln or the Republican Party, which called for the gradual ending of slavery.

Benjamin Franklin, a slaveholder for much of his life, became a leading member of the Pennsylvania Society for the Abolition of Slavery, the first recognized organization for abolitionists in the United States. Following the American Revolutionary War, Northern states abolished slavery, beginning with the 1777 Constitution of Vermont, followed by Pennsylvania's gradual emancipation act in 1780. Other states with more of an economic interest in slaves, such as New York and New Jersey, also passed gradual emancipation laws, and by 1804, all the Northern states had abolished it, although this did not mean that already enslaved people were freed. Some had to work without wages as "indentured servants" for two more decades, although they could no longer be sold.

The 1836–1837 campaign to end free speech in Alton, Illinois, culminated in the 7 November 1837 mob murder of abolitionist newspaper editor Elijah Parish Lovejoy, which was covered in newspapers nationwide, causing a rise in membership in abolitionist societies. By 1840 more than 15,000 people were members of abolitionist societies in the United States. The formation of Christian denominations that heralded abolitionism as a moral issue occurred, such as the organization of Wesleyan Methodist Connection by Orange Scott in 1843, and the formation of the Free Methodist Church by Benjamin Titus Roberts in 1860 (which is reflected in the name of Church).

Abolition of slavery in the various states of the US over time: Abolition of slavery during or shortly after the American Revolution (Vermont, 1777; Massachusetts [including Maine], 1783) The Northwest Ordinance, 1787 Gradual emancipation in New York (starting 1799, ended 1827), Pennsylvania (1780–1857), New Hampshire (1783–1857), Connecticut [including the Western Reserve] (1784–1848), Rhode Island (1784–1853) and New Jersey (starting 1804; ended by Thirteenth Amendment, 1865) The Missouri Compromise, 1821 Effective abolition of slavery by Mexican or joint US/British authority Abolition of slavery by Congressional action, 1861 Abolition of slavery by Congressional action, 1862 Emancipation Proclamation as originally issued, 1 Jan 1863 Subsequent operation of the Emancipation Proclamation in 1863 Abolition of slavery by state action during the Civil War Operation of the Emancipation Proclamation in 1864 Operation of the Emancipation Proclamation in 1865 Thirteenth Amendment to the US constitution, 18 Dec 1865 Territory incorporated into the US after the passage of the Thirteenth Amendment

In the 1850s in the fifteen states constituting the American South, slavery was legally established. While it was fading away in the cities as well as in the border states, it remained strong in plantation areas that grew cotton for export, or sugar, tobacco, or hemp. According to the 1860 United States census, the slave population in the United States had grown to four million. American abolitionism was based in the North, although there were anti-abolitionist riots in several cities. In the South abolitionism was illegal, and abolitionist publications, like The Liberator, could not be sent to Southern post offices. Amos Dresser, a white alumnus of Lane Theological Seminary, was publicly whipped in Nashville, Tennessee, for possessing abolitionist publications. In addition, laws were passed to further repress slaves. These laws included anti-literacy laws and anti-gathering laws. The anti-gathering laws were applied to religious gatherings of free blacks and slaves. These laws, passed around the 1820–1850 period, were blamed in the South on Northern abolitionists. As one slaveowner wrote, "I can tell you. It was the abolition agitation. If the slave is not allowed to read his bible, the sin rests upon the abolitionists; for they stand prepared to furnish him with a key to it, which would make it, not a book of hope, and love, and peace, but of despair, hatred and blood; which would convert the reader, not into a Christian, but a demon. [...] Allow our slaves to read your writings, stimulating them to cut our throats! Can you believe us to be such unspeakable fools?"

Abolitionism in the United States became a popular expression of moralism, operating in tandem with other social reform efforts, such as the temperance movement, and much more problematically, the women's suffrage movement.

The white abolitionist movement in the North was led by social reformers, especially William Lloyd Garrison (founder of the American Anti-Slavery Society) and writers Wendell Phillips, John Greenleaf Whittier, and Harriet Beecher Stowe. Black activists included former slaves such as Frederick Douglass and free blacks such as the brothers Charles Henry Langston and John Mercer Langston, who helped found the Ohio Anti-Slavery Society. Some abolitionists said that slavery was criminal and a sin; they also criticized slave owners of using black women as concubines and taking sexual advantage of them.

The Republican Party wanted to achieve the gradual extinction of slavery by market forces, because it believed that free labor was superior to slave labor. White Southern leaders said that the Republican policy of blocking the expansion of slavery into the territories made them second-class citizens and, as the Dred Scott decision held, infringed slaveholders' property rights. With the 1860 presidential victory of Abraham Lincoln, seven Deep South states whose economy was based on cotton and the labor of enslaved people decided to secede and form a new nation. The American Civil War broke out in April 1861 with the Confederacy's firing on Fort Sumter, a Union fort in South Carolina. When Lincoln called for troops to suppress the rebellion, four more slave states seceded. Meanwhile, four slave states, known as the border states (Maryland, Missouri, Delaware, and Kentucky), chose to remain in the Union.

==== Civil War and final emancipation ====
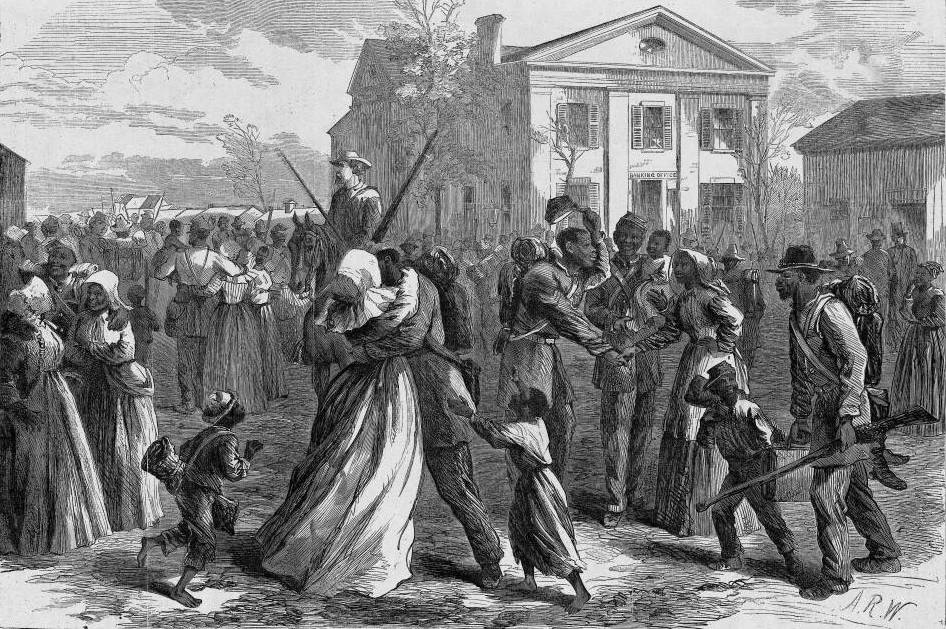
United States Union black volunteer soldiers muster out to their first freedom at Little Rock, Arkansas, Harper's Weekly, 1866

On 16 April 1862, Abraham Lincoln signed the District of Columbia Compensated Emancipation Act, abolishing slavery in Washington D. C. Meanwhile, the Union suddenly found itself dealing with a steady stream of escaped slaves from the South rushing to Union lines. In response, Congress passed the Confiscation Acts, which essentially declared escaped slaves from the South to be confiscated war property, called contrabands, so that they would not be returned to their masters in the Confederacy. Although the initial act did not mention emancipation, the second Confiscation Act, passed on 17 July 1862, stated that escaped or liberated slaves belonging to anyone who participated in or supported the rebellion "shall be deemed captives of war, and shall be forever free of their servitude, and not again held as slaves". On 1 January 1863, Lincoln issued the Emancipation Proclamation, which was an executive order of the U.S. government that changed the legal status of 3 million slaves in the Confederacy from "slave" to "henceforward ... free". Though slaves were legally freed by the Proclamation, they became actually free by escaping to federal lines, or by advances of federal troops. Even before the Emancipation Proclamation, many former slaves served the federal army as teamsters, cooks, laundresses, and laborers, as well as scouts, spies, and guides. Confederate General Robert Lee once said, "The chief source of information to the enemy is through our negroes." The Emancipation Proclamation, however, provided that people it declared to be free who were "of suitable condition, will be received into the armed service of the United States", and the United States Colored Troops were formed.

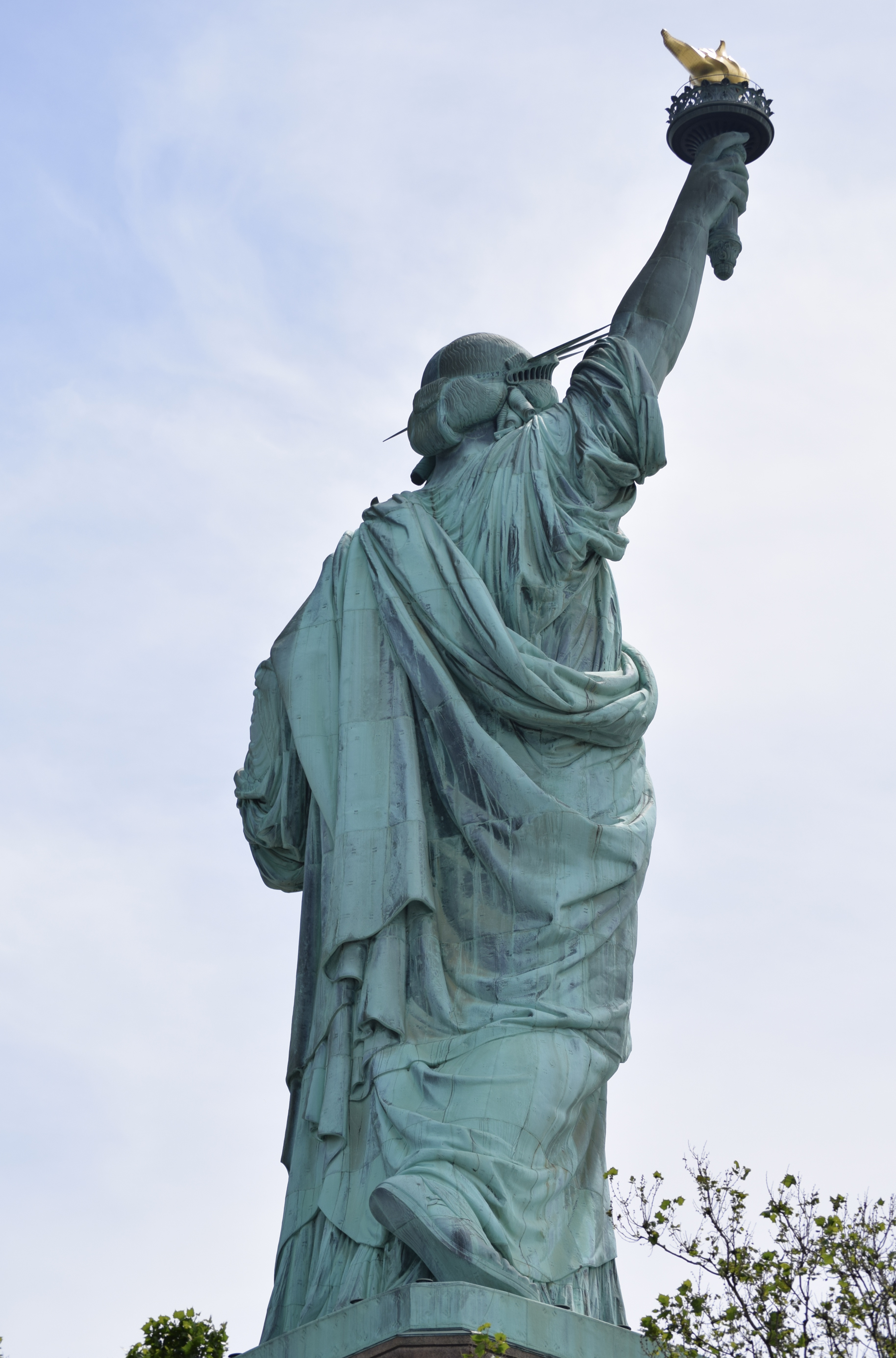
The Statue of Liberty was conceived by French abolitionist Édouard René de Laboulaye to commemorate the end of slavery in the US. The initial design saw her hold a broken chain in her left hand, but American financiers were opposed to the statue acknowledging slavery; the sculptor Bartholdi retained the chains at her feet (pictured) which are barely visible.

Plantation owners sometimes moved the Black people they claimed to own as far as possible out of reach of the Union army. By "Juneteenth" (19 June 1865, in Texas), the Union Army controlled all of the Confederacy and liberated all its slaves. The owners were never compensated; nor were freed slaves compensated by former owners.

The border states were exempt from the Emancipation Proclamation, but they too (except Delaware) began their own emancipation programs. As the war dragged on, both the federal government and Union states continued to take measures against slavery. In June 1864, the Fugitive Slave Act of 1850, which required free states to aid in returning escaped slaves to slave states, was repealed. The state of Maryland abolished slavery on 13 October 1864. Missouri abolished slavery on 11 January 1865. West Virginia, which had been admitted to the Union in 1863 as a slave state, but on the condition of gradual emancipation, fully abolished slavery on 3 February 1865. The 13th Amendment to the U.S. Constitution took effect in December 1865, seven months after the end of the war, and finally ended slavery for non-criminals throughout the United States. It also abolished slavery among the Indian tribes, including the Alaska tribes that became part of the U.S. in 1867.

=== Cuba and Brazil ===
Brazil and Cuba abolished slavery in the 1880s, with Cuba ending it in 1886 and Brazil in 1888. While actors like Gertrudis Gómez de Avellaneda in Cuba and Adelina Charuteira in Brazil worked to end slavery, it was enslaved people themselves who worked daily to chip away at enslavers' local authority. These actions have at times been dismissed because they were small actions, but historian Adriana Chira argues that while "These freedoms were patchwork, often incomplete when measured against liberal – abolitionist yardsticks, precarious and even reversible" the action " ... were very concrete, and in the long term, they served to corrode the legal structures of plantation slavery locally." These actions included marronage and maroon societies that undermined the authority of enslavers in Brazil and legal challenges relying on the legal history of Spain in Cuba. These practices are regionally specific based on the legal customs of the region that enslaved people knew well from centuries of interactions with Iberian slave laws. A key avenue for these legal arguments was the prominence of "lo extrajudicial", a field of legal interactions adjacent to a lawsuit explained by historian Bianca Premo as consisting of out-of-court settlements, public revelations, and face-to-face encounters.

== Africa ==
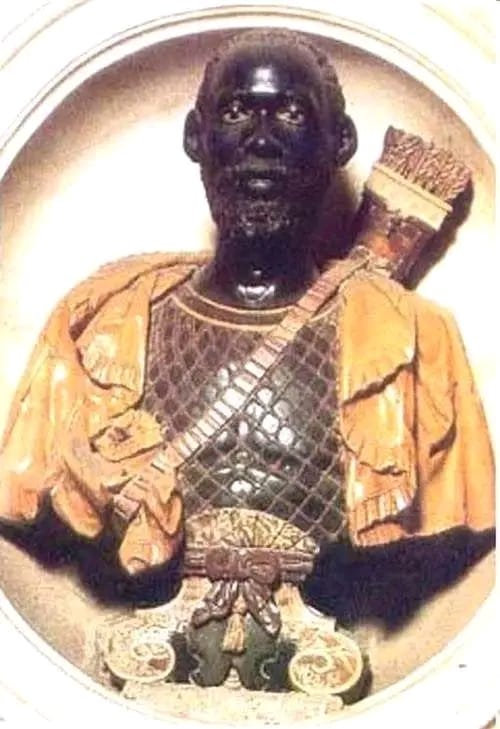
Lourenço da Silva Mendouça

Lourenço da Silva Mendouça (1640s – 1698) was member of the royal family of the Kingdom of Ndongo in what is now Angola. An abolitionist, he was likely the first person to successfully convince authorities to end slavery in Europe. A Catholic, his dealings were mostly with Church authorities and those with whom they were associated.

Senegambia is an example of an influential African region furthering abolition.

== Women and abolitionism ==
The suffering of women in slavery was a common trope consistently used in abolitionists' rhetoric on both sides of the Atlantic. This was especially true as it relates to the image of suffering mothers and their children. Towards the end of the nineteenth century as slavery was coming to an end throughout the Atlantic world, images appearing in abolitionist publications routinely included images of families being torn apart and pregnant women being forced to do hard labor. As countries imposed "free womb laws" to soften the image of slavery and bring about gradual emancipation, for many it raised the question of the justice of women being used to carry out emancipation without benefiting from it themselves. Speeches given on the topic at the time focused on mothers and compared them to "all other mothers", using motherhood to level the subjects and objects of their speech.

Women were also often on the forefront of the abolition movement. Authors such as Harriet Beecher Stowe (United States) and Gertrudis Gómez de Avellaneda (Brazil) used their novels to call into question the humanity of slavery. Women such as the Grimké Sisters, Abigail Adams, Elizabeth Cady Stanton and others used their connections to political movements to advocate for the abolition of slavery. Enslaved women such as Phillis Wheatley and Harriet Tubman took matters into their own hands by challenging the institution of slavery through their writing and their actions. In countries like Cuba and Brazil, where many enslaved women in urban areas were close to the governmental apparatuses needed to challenge slavery, they often used this proximity to pay for their and their families freedom and argued before colonial courts for their freedom with increasing success as the nineteenth century progressed. Enslaved women like Adelina Charuteira used their mobility as street vendors and as much access as they had to literacy to spread information about abolition between freedom-seeking people and local abolitionist networks.

== Notable abolitionists ==
White and black opponents of slavery, who played a considerable role in the movement. This list includes some escaped slaves, who were traditionally called abolitionists.

- John Quincy Adams
- Abigail Adams
- Lydia Maria Child
- Prudence Crandall
- Gertrudis Gómez de Avellaneda
- Adelina Charuteira
- Phillis Wheatley
- Angelina Grimké
- Sarah Grimké
- Jeremy Bentham
- Benjamin Lay
- James McCune Smith
- John Brown
- William Wells Brown
- Oren Burbank Cheney
- Thomas Clarkson
- Ellen and William Craft
- Frederick Douglass
- Sarah Mapps Douglass
- Henry Dundas (Note: Henry Dundas achieved the first victory in the House of Commons for the abolition of the Atlantic Slave Trade in 1792.)
- John Gregg Fee
- Henry Highland Garnet
- William Lloyd Garrison
- Elijah P. Lovejoy
- Abbé Grégoire
- Frances Ellen Watkins Harper
- Johns Hopkins
- Isabel, Princess Imperial of Brazil
- John Laurens
- Toussaint Louverture
- Solomon Northup
- Harriet Martineau
- John Stuart Mill
- Charles Miner
- Joaquim Nabuco
- Daniel O'Connell
- José do Patrocínio
- William B. Preston
- André Rebouças
- Granville Sharp
- Robert Stewart, Viscount Castlereagh
- Harriet Beecher Stowe
- Henry David Thoreau
- Sojourner Truth
- Harriet Tubman
- Nat Turner
- David Walker
- William Wilberforce (Note: Wilberforce was a leader of the abolitionism movement. He was an English politician who became a Member of Parliament. His involvement in the political realm lead to a change in ideology.)
- John Woolman

== Abolitionist publications ==
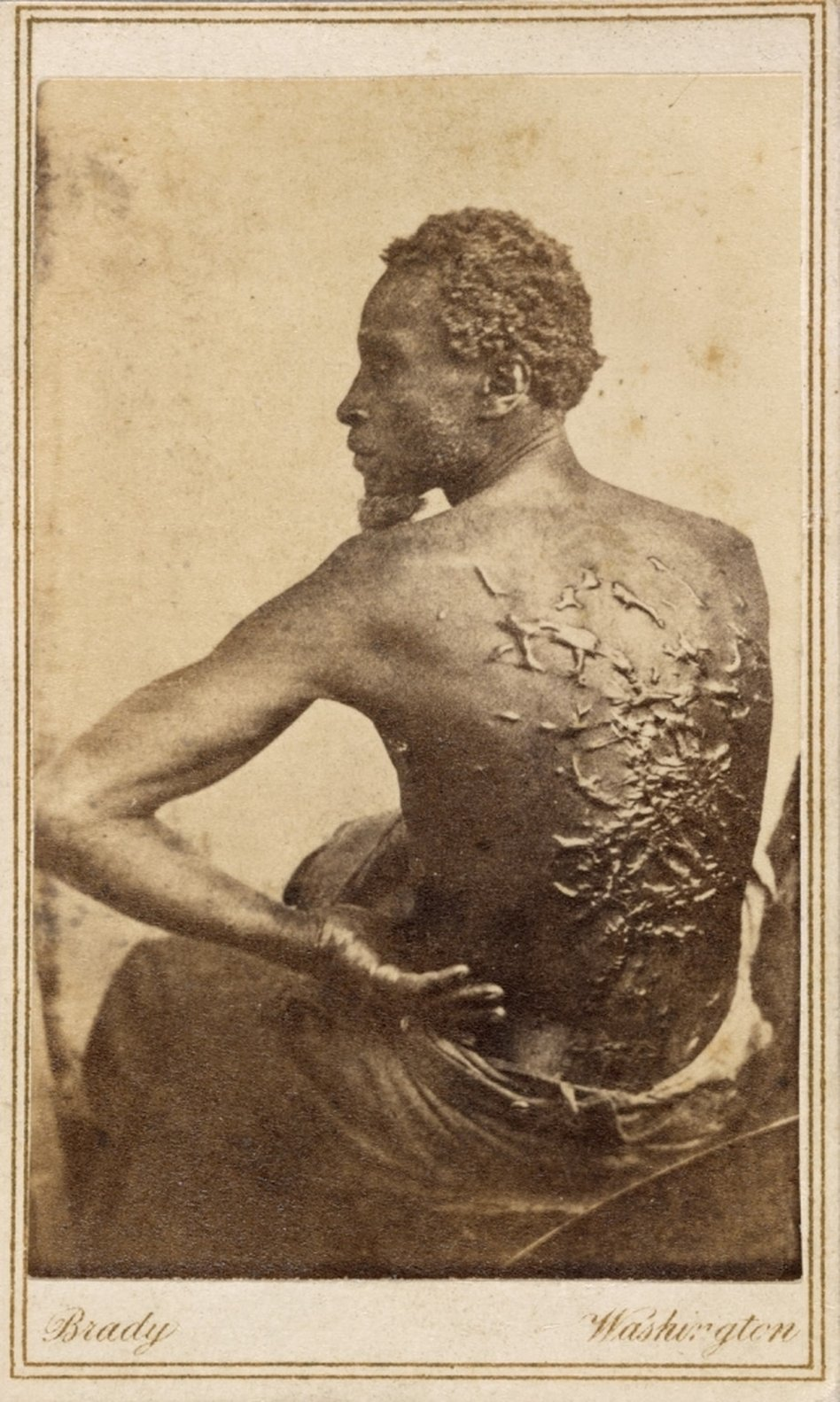
Medical examination photo of Gordon showing his scourged back, widely distributed by Abolitionists to expose the brutality of slavery. From at least the 1860s onwards, photography was a powerful tool in the abolitionist movement.

=== United States ===
- The Emancipator (1819–20): founded in Jonesboro, Tennessee in 1819 by Elihu Embree as the Manumission Intelligencier, The Emancipator ceased publication in October 1820 due to Embree's illness. It was sold in 1821 and became The Genius of Universal Emancipation.
- Genius of Universal Emancipation (1821–39): an abolitionist newspaper published and edited by Benjamin Lundy. In 1829 it employed William Lloyd Garrison, who would go on to create The Liberator.
- The Liberator (1831–65): a weekly newspaper founded by William Lloyd Garrison.
- The Emancipator (1833–50): different from The Emancipator above. Published in New York and later Boston.
- The Slave's Friend (1836–38): an anti-slavery magazine for children produced by the American Anti-Slavery Society (AASS).
- The Philanthropist (1836–37): newspaper published in Ohio for and owned by the Anti-Slavery Society.
- The Liberty Bell, by Friends of Freedom (1839–58): an annual gift book edited and published by Maria Weston Chapman, to be sold or gifted to participants in the anti-slavery bazaars organized by the Boston Female Anti-Slavery Society.
- National Anti-Slavery Standard (1840–70): the official weekly newspaper of the American Anti-Slavery Society, the paper published continuously until the ratification of the Fifteenth Amendment to the United States Constitution in 1870.
- True Wesleyan (1843–present), founded by Orange Scott and Jotham Horton, this became the periodical of the Wesleyan Methodist Church and had a focus on abolitionism
- The Unconstitutionality of Slavery (1845): a pamphlet by Lysander Spooner advocating the view that the U.S. Constitution prohibited slavery.
- The Anti-Slavery Bugle (1845–1861): a newspaper published in New Lisbon and Salem, Columbiana County, Ohio, and distributed locally and across the mid-west, primarily to Quakers.
- The National Era (1847–60): a weekly newspaper which featured the works of John Greenleaf Whittier, who served as associate editor, and first published, as a serial, Harriet Beecher Stowe's Uncle Tom's Cabin (1851).
- North Star (1847–51): an anti-slavery American newspaper published by the escaped slave, author, and abolitionist Frederick Douglass.

=== International ===
- Slave narratives, books published in the U.S. and elsewhere by former slaves or about former slaves, relating their experiences.
- Anti-Slavery International publications
- Voice of the Fugitive (1851–1853): one of the first black newspapers in Upper Canada aimed at fugitive and escaped slaves from the United States. Written by Henry Bibb, an escaped slave who also published his own slave narrative. Published biweekly.
- Provincial Freeman (March 1853–June 1857): a weekly newspaper published by free Black American ex-patriates in Canada, Mary Ann Shadd and others.
- Voice of the Bondsman (1856–1857): a small run two-issue newspaper published by John James Linton, a sympathizing white Canadian.
- The Catalanist press of the late 19th century also addressed the issue of Black slavery and the abolitionist process, particularly in light of the persistence of slavery in Cuba. Various Catalanist publications of the era—such as Valentí Almirall’s Diari Català—denounced the situation, even highlighting the limitations of the Moret Law; this underscores the presence of the debate on slavery within the late 19th-century Catalanist press.

== National abolition dates ==
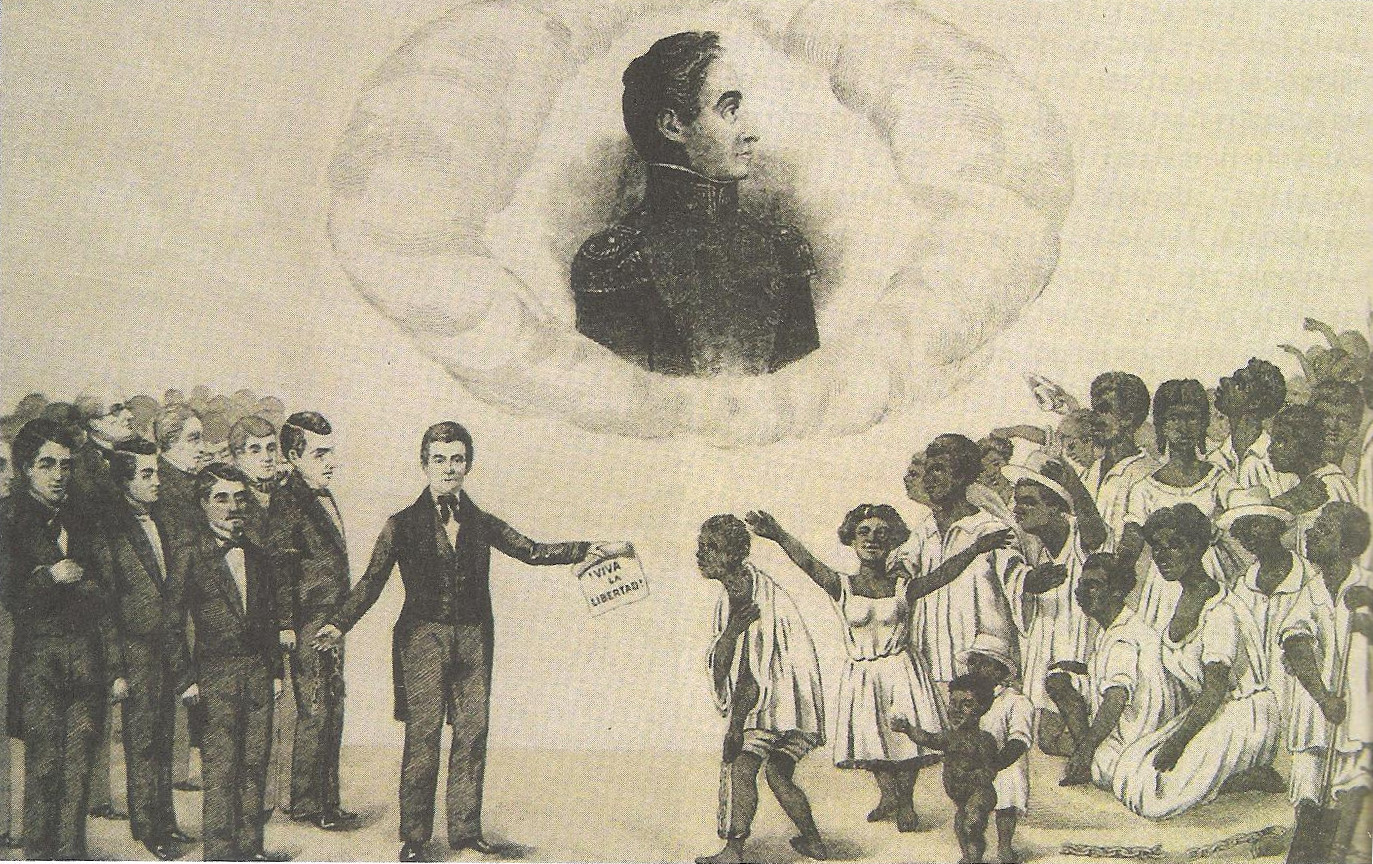
José Gregorio Monagas abolished slavery in Venezuela in 1854.

== International abolitionism ==
The first international attempt to address the abolition of slavery was the World Anti-Slavery Convention, organised by the British and Foreign Anti-Slavery Society at Exeter Hall in London, on 12–23 June 1840. This was however an attempt made by NGOs, not by state and governments. In the late 19th century, the issue was addressed on an international level by states and governments. The Brussels Anti-Slavery Conference 1889–90 addressed slavery on a semi-global level via the representatives of the colonial powers. It had concluded with the Brussels Conference Act of 1890. The 1890 Act was revised by the Convention of Saint-Germain-en-Laye 1919.

During the 20th century the issue of slavery was addressed by the League of Nations, which founded commissions to investigate and eradicate the institution of slavery and slave trade worldwide. The Temporary Slavery Commission (TSC), which was founded in 1924, conducted a global investigation and filed a report, and a convention was drawn up to hasten the total abolition of slavery and the slave trade. The 1926 Slavery Convention, which was founded upon the investigation of the TSC of the League of Nations, was a turning point in banning global slavery.

In 1932, the League formed the Committee of Experts on Slavery (CES) to review the result and enforcement of the 1926 Slavery Convention, which resulted in a new international investigation under the first permanent slavery committee, the Advisory Committee of Experts on Slavery (ACE). The ACE conducted a major international investigation on slavery and slave trade, inspecting all the colonial empires and the territories under their control between 1934 and 1939.

Article 4 of the Universal Declaration of Human Rights, adopted in 1948 by the UN General Assembly, explicitly banned slavery. After World War II, chattel slavery was formally abolished by law in almost the entire world, with the exception of the Arabian Peninsula and some parts of Africa. Chattel slavery was still legal in Saudi Arabia, in Yemen, in the Trucial States and in Oman, and slaves were supplied to the Arabian Peninsula via the Red Sea slave trade.

When the League of Nations was succeeded by the United Nations (UN) after World War II, Charles Wilton Wood Greenidge of the Anti-Slavery International worked for the UN to continue the investigation of global slavery conducted by the ACE of the League, and in February 1950 the Ad Hoc Committee on Slavery of the United Nations was inaugurated, which ultimately resulted in the introduction of the Supplementary Convention on the Abolition of Slavery.

The United Nations 1956 Supplementary Convention on the Abolition of Slavery was convened to outlaw and ban slavery worldwide, including child slavery. In November 1962, Faisal of Saudi Arabia finally prohibited the owning of slaves in Saudi Arabia, followed by the abolition of slavery in Yemen in 1962, slavery in Dubai 1963 and slavery in Oman in 1970.

In December 1966, the UN General Assembly adopted the International Covenant on Civil and Political Rights, which was developed from the Universal Declaration of Human Rights. Article 4 of this international treaty bans slavery. The treaty came into force in March 1976 after it had been ratified by 35 nations.

As of November 2003, 104 nations had ratified the treaty. However, illegal forced labor involves millions of people in the 21st century, 43% for sexual exploitation and 32% for economic exploitation.

In May 2004, the 22 members of the Arab League adopted the Arab Charter on Human Rights, which incorporated the 1990 Cairo Declaration on Human Rights in Islam, which states:

Human beings are born free, and no one has the right to enslave, humiliate, oppress or exploit them, and there can be no subjugation but to God the Most-High.

— Article 11, Cairo Declaration on Human Rights in Islam, 1990

Currently, the Anti-trafficking Coordination Team Initiative (ACT Team Initiative), a coordinated effort between the U.S. Departments of Justice, Homeland Security, and Labor, addresses human trafficking. The International Labour Organization estimates that there are 20.9 million victims of human trafficking globally, including 5.5 million children, of which 55% are women and girls.

== After abolition ==
In societies with large proportions of the population working in conditions of slavery or serfdom, stroke-of-the-pen laws declaring abolition can have thorough-going social, economic and political consequences. Issues of compensation/redemption, land-redistribution and citizenship can prove intractable. For example:

- Haiti, which effectively achieved abolition due to slave revolt and revolution (1792–1804), struggled to overcome racial or anti-revolutionary prejudice in the international financial and diplomatic scene, and exchanged unequal prosperity for relative poverty. One major cause of Haiti's enduring poverty is the Haiti Independence Debt France forced on Haiti as "compensated emancipation" for emancipation in 1825 and which (including secondary debts and interests) was not paid off until 1947.
- Russia's emancipation of its serfs in 1861 failed to allay rural and industrial unrest, which played a part in fomenting the revolutions of 1917.
- The United States achieved freedom for its slaves in 1865 with the ratification of the 13th Amendment on 6 December of that year but faced ongoing slavery-associated racial issues (Jim Crow system, civil-rights struggles, penal labor in the United States).

== Commemoration ==
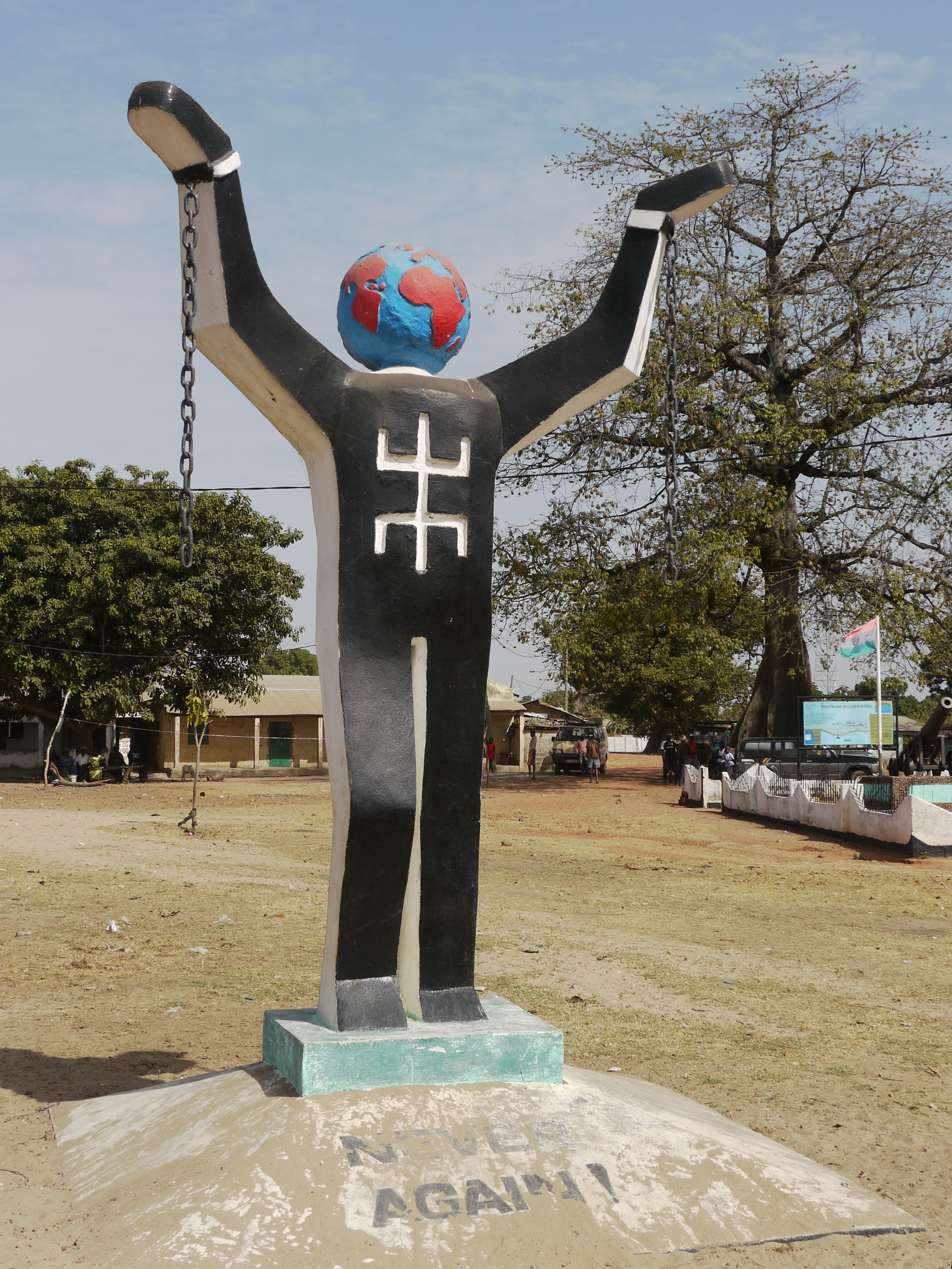
Statue on Kunta Kinteh Island, The Gambia, commemorating the end of the Atlantic slave trade; the stick figure is a Kanaga mask.

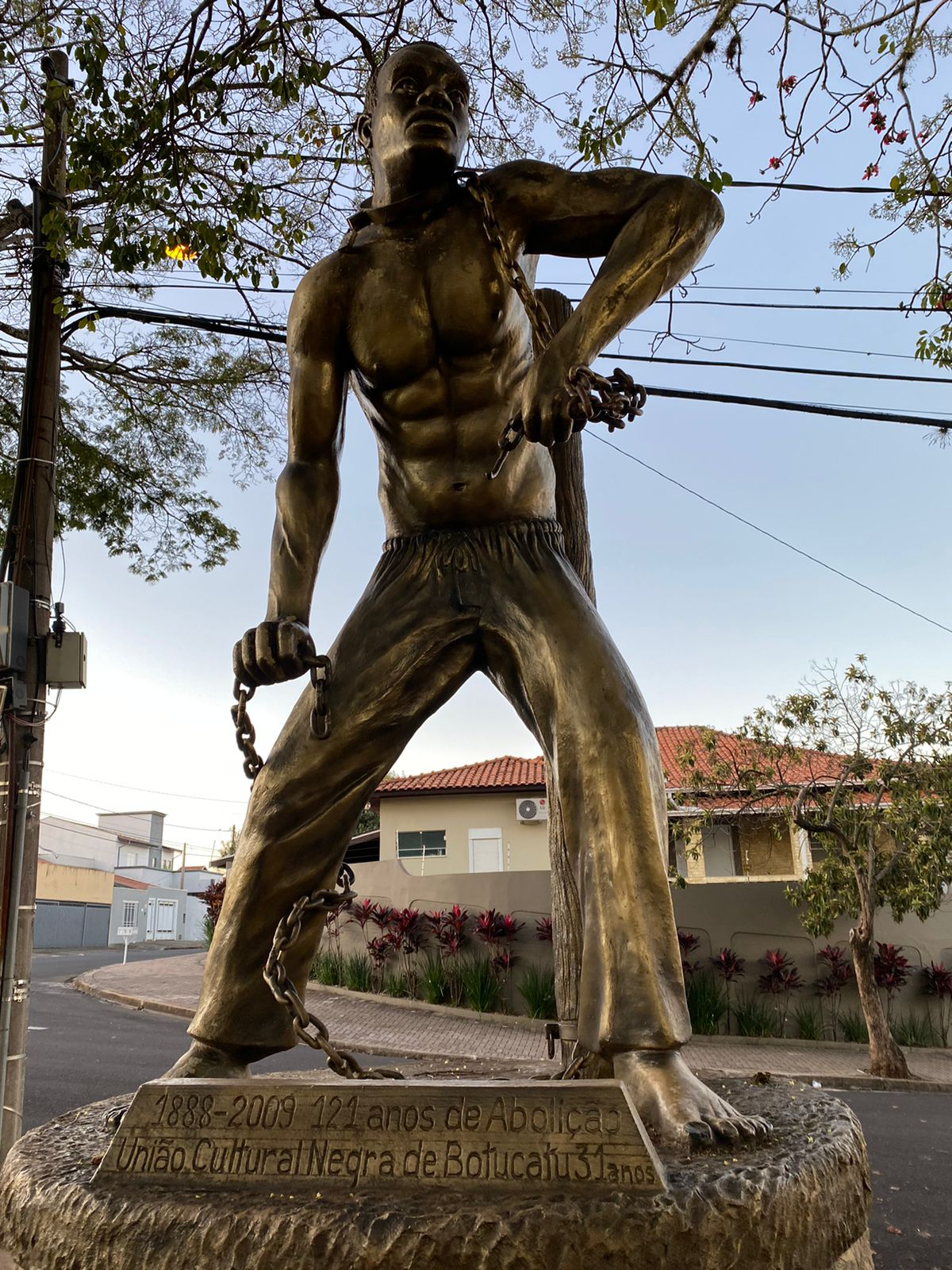
Commemorative statue of 121 years of abolition in Botucatu, Brazil

People in modern times have commemorated abolitionist movements and the abolition of slavery in different ways around the world. The United Nations General Assembly declared 2004 the International Year to Commemorate the Struggle against Slavery and its Abolition. This proclamation marked the bicentenary of the proclamation of the first modern slavery-free state, Haiti. Numerous exhibitions, events and research programmes became associated with the initiative.

2007 witnessed major exhibitions in British museums and galleries to mark the anniversary of the 1807 abolition act – 1807 Commemorated 2008 marked the 201st anniversary of the Abolition of the Slave Trade in the British Empire. It also marked the 175th anniversary of the abolition of slavery in the British Empire.

The Faculty of Law at the University of Ottawa held a major international conference entitled, "Routes to Freedom: Reflections on the Bicentenary of the Abolition of the Slave Trade", from 14 to 16 March 2008.

== American abolitionist constitutionalism ==
Abolitionist constitutionalism is a line of thinking which invokes the historical view of the Constitution of the United States as an abolitionist document. It calls for an appeal to constitutionalism and progressive constitutionalism. This vision is interdisciplinary and finds its roots in the anti-slavery movement in the United States of America and is largely based on the tenet that current state institutions, particularly the carceral system, is rooted in the transatlantic slave trade. Some constitutional abolitionists critique the claim that the Constitution was pro-slavery.

Radical abolitionist constitutionalism calls for the idea of dignity and the use of jurisprudence to address social inequalities.

Whereas the original U.S. Constitution was pro-slavery, the Reconstruction Amendments can be seen as a compromise for freedom, without allowing for the full abolition. Criminal punishment was a major way that Southern states maintained the exploitation of black labor and effectively nullified the Reconstruction Amendments. This was done namely through Black Codes, harsh vagrancy laws, apprenticeship laws and extreme punishment for black people. The Reconstruction Amendments in their aim to promote citizenship and emancipation are believed by these thinkers to still be guiding principles in the fight for freedom and abolition.

There are suggestions that a broad reading of the Thirteenth Amendment can convey an abolitionist vision of the freedom advocated for by black people in the public sphere beyond emancipation.

Section one of the Fourteenth Amendment was used by many abolitionist lawyers and activists throughout the North to advance the case against slavery.

Proponents of abolitionist constitutionalism believe the Thirteenth and Fourteenth Amendments can be used today to extend the abolitionist logics to the various current barriers to injustices that are faced by marginalized peoples.

Just like abolitionism more generally, abolitionist constitutionalism seeks to provide a vision which will lead to the abolition of many different neoliberal state institutions, such as the prison industrial complex, the wage system, and policing. This is tied to a belief that white supremacy is woven into the fabric of legal state institutions.

Radical abolitionists are often marginalized. There is a belief that constitutionalism as a main tenet of radical abolitionism can change and appeal to the popular opinion more. Historically, slavery abolitionists have had to use the public meaning of Constitutional terms in order in their fight against slavery. Constitutional abolitionists are generally in favour of incremental changes that follow the principles of the Reconstructive Amendments.

There are debates among abolitionists, where some claim that the Constitution ought not to be treated as an abolitionist text, as it is rather used as a legal tool by the state to deny freedoms to marginalized communities; and that contemporary abolitionist work cannot be done by relying on the constitutional texts. Some argue that the narrative and scholarly literature around Reconstruction Amendments is not coherent regarding their original aims.

== Contemporary abolitionism ==
On 10 December 1948, the General Assembly of the United Nations adopted the Universal Declaration of Human Rights. Article 4 states:

No one shall be held in slavery or servitude; slavery and the slave trade shall be prohibited in all their forms.

Although outlawed in most countries, slavery is nonetheless practised secretly in many parts of the world. Enslavement still takes place in the United States, Europe, and Latin America, as well as parts of Africa, the Middle East, and South Asia. Modern slavery keeps around 50 million people from exercising their freedom. In Mauritania alone, estimates are that up to 600,000 men, women and children, or 20% of the population, are enslaved. Many of them are used as bonded labor.

Modern-day abolitionists have emerged over the last several years, as awareness of slavery around the world has grown, with groups such as Anti-Slavery International, the American Anti-Slavery Group, International Justice Mission, and Free the Slaves working to rid the world of slavery.

In the United States, The Action Group to End Human Trafficking and Modern-Day Slavery is a coalition of NGOs, foundations and corporations working to develop a policy agenda for abolishing slavery and human trafficking. Since 1997, the United States Department of Justice has, through work with the Coalition of Immokalee Workers, prosecuted six individuals in Florida on charges of slavery in the agricultural industry. These prosecutions have led to freedom for over 1000 enslaved workers in the tomato and orange fields of South Florida. This is only one example of the contemporary fight against slavery worldwide. Slavery exists most widely in agricultural labor, apparel and sex industries, and service jobs in some regions.

In 2000, the United States passed the Victims of Trafficking and Violence Protection Act (TVPA) "to combat trafficking in persons, especially into the sex trade, slavery, and involuntary servitude". The TVPA also "created new law enforcement tools to strengthen the prosecution and punishment of traffickers, making human trafficking a Federal crime with severe penalties."

In 2014, for the first time in history major Anglican, Catholic, and Orthodox Christian leaders, as well as Jewish, Muslim, Hindu, and Buddhist leaders, met to sign a shared commitment against modern-day slavery; the declaration they signed calls for the elimination of slavery and human trafficking by 2020.

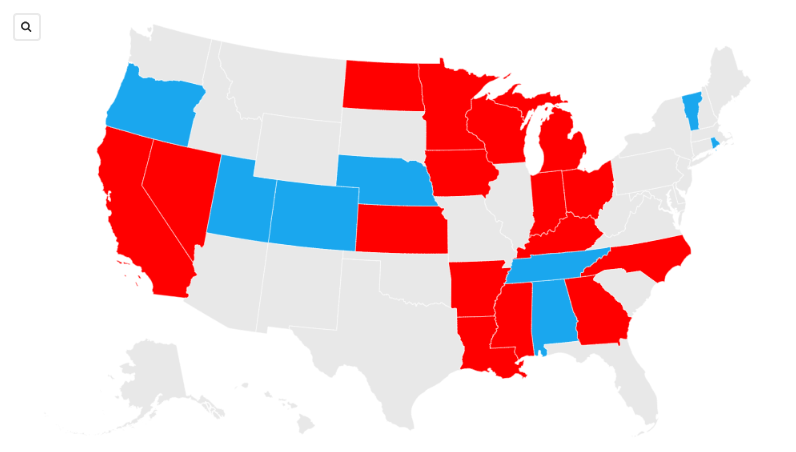
Map of states where slave prison labor is permitted in the state constitution as of November 2022 Permitted Forbidden No mention in constitution

The United States Department of State publishes the annual Trafficking in Persons Report, identifying countries as either Tier 1, Tier 2, Tier 2 Watch List or Tier 3, depending upon three factors: "(1) The extent to which the country is a country of origin, transit, or destination for severe forms of trafficking; (2) The extent to which the government of the country does not comply with the TVPA's minimum standards including, in particular, the extent of the government's trafficking-related corruption; and (3) The resources and capabilities of the government to address and eliminate severe forms of trafficking in persons."

The 13th amendment abolished slavery in the United States "except as a punishment for crime whereof the party shall have been duly convicted". In 2018, Colorado became the first state to remove similar language in its state constitution by a legislatively referred ballot referendum. Other states have followed suit, but implementation has relied on court rulings.

== See also ==
- Abolitionism (disambiguation), other movements to address perceived social ills, such as the Prison abolition movement
- Anti-Slavery Society (disambiguation), various organisations referred to by this name
- Compensated emancipation
- History of slavery
- List of abolitionist forerunners
- London Society of West India Planters and Merchants, a lobby group representing slave owners
- Monumento a la abolición de la esclavitud, in Puerto Rico
- Representation of slavery in European art
- Slavery in Britain
- Slavery in the British and French Caribbean
- Slavery in the United States
- Timeline of abolition of slavery and serfdom
- Brussels Anti-Slavery Conference 1889–90

=== Organisations and commemorations ===
- International Day for the Abolition of Slavery
- International Day for the Remembrance of the Slave Trade and its Abolition

== Sources ==
- Hague, William (2005). William Pitt the Younger. HarperPerennial. ISBN 978-0-00-714720-5.
- Jennings, Lawrence C. (2006). French Anti-Slavery: The Movement for the Abolition of Slavery in France, 1802–1848. Cambridge University Press. ISBN 978-0521028783.
