= National Electric Light Association =

United States trade association for power plants in the 1800s

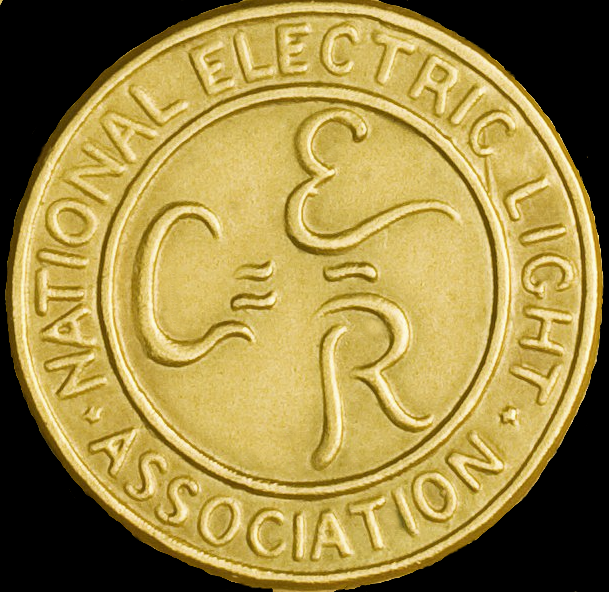
- NELA Logo
- Successor: Edison Electric Institute
- Formation: 1885; 141 years ago
- Founder: George S. Bowen; Franklin S. Terry; Charles S. Brown
- Founded at: Chicago, Illinois, U.S.
- Dissolved: February 15, 1933; 93 years ago
- Type: Association
- Headquarters: New York City, New York
- Region served: North America
- Services: Publication: Bulletin (monthly); Publication: Rate Research (semi-annual); Publication: Convention Proceedings; Publications: Electrical Courses; Lobbying; Yearly conventions Public Relations
- Fields: Electric Industry
- Members: 11,000 (1921)
- President: Yearly Term
- Key people: Samuel Insull; Sidney Z. Mitchell; Henry L. Doherty; Merlin H. Aylesworth
- Subsidiaries: Mississippi Electric Assn. Northwest Electric Light & Power Assn. Pennsylvania Electric Assn. Wisconsin Electric Assn.
- Affiliations: U.S. Chamber of Commerce; American Electric Railway Assn. American Gas Assn. Joint Committee of National Utility Assn.

The National Electric Light Association (NELA) was a national United States trade association that included the operators of electric central power generation stations, electrical supply companies, electrical engineers, scientists, educational institutions and interested individuals. Founded in 1885 by George S. Bowen, Franklin S. Terry and Charles A. Brown, it represented the interests of private companies involved in the fledgling electric power industry that included companies like General Electric, Westinghouse and most of the country's electric companies. The NELA played a dominant role in promoting the interests and expansion of the U.S. commercial electric industry. The association's conventions became a major clearinghouse for technical papers covering the entire field of electricity and its development, with a special focus on the components needed for centralized power stations or power plants. In 1895 the association sponsored a conference that led to the issue of the first edition of the U.S. National Electrical Code. Its rapid growth mirrored the development of electricity in the U.S. that included regional and statewide affiliations across the country and Canada. It was the forerunner of the Edison Electric Institute (founded in 1933). Its highly aggressive battle against municipal ownership of electric production led to extensive federal hearings between 1928 and 1935 that resulted in its demise. Its logo is an early depiction of Ohm's law which is "C equals E divided by R," or "the current strength in any circuit is equal to the electromotive force divided by the resistance," or the basic law of electricity. It was established in 1827 by Dr. G. S. Ohm.

== Structure ==
During its first convention, the NELA set up a formal structure that included a constitution and a governing body made up of elected officers using committees to carry out the interests of its members. By 1904, the NELA had 588 members that were broken down into major classes. The membership included all of the major electric suppliers, like Edison Electric Company that later became General Electric as well as most of the larger electric generating companies from the east to west coast. The list of honorary members included Baron Alphonse James de Rothschild, Charles A. Coffin (the head of General Electric), George Westinghouse, Lord Kelvin, Charles F. Brush, Thomas A. Edison, Prof. Elihu Thomson, and Nikola Tesla. Tesla read his technical paper on "Light and Other High Frequency Phenomena" at the 1893 convention in St. Louis. By 1921, the NELA had eight different classes of membership with over 11,000 members including companies, associations and individuals from other countries.

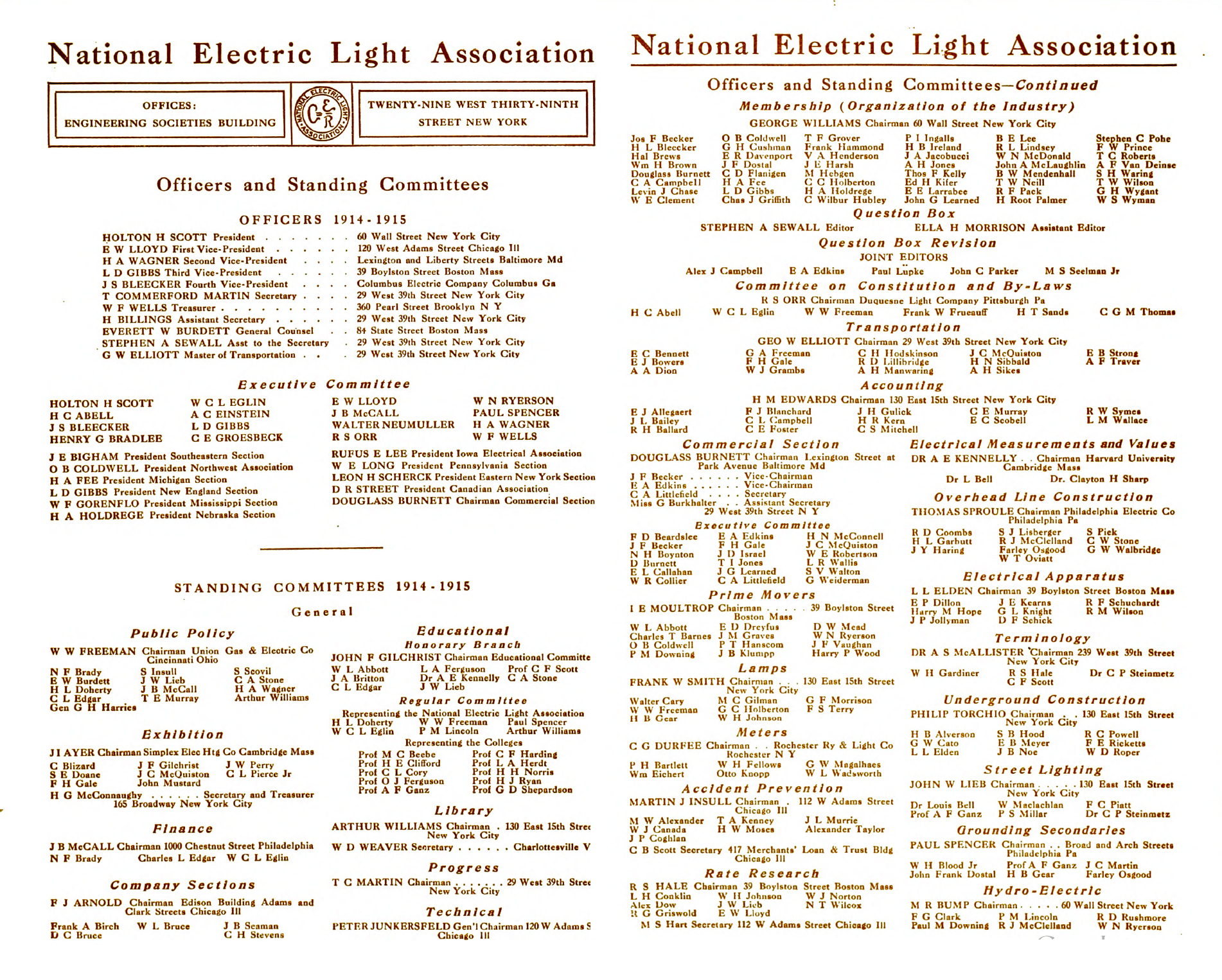
NELA Structure c. 1915

The NELA had nearly 30 different committees in place that came together during its conventions. These committees that included geographical representatives from the industry broken down by region and state-affiliated associations and industry representatives coordinated the distribution of reports on best practices and standards of the industry from the ratings of light bulbs, safety, accounting practices, engineering designs of equipment to advertising, public relations and legislative campaigns.

Each year, the NELA selected a new president to lead the association from an executive of a major electric power company. For example, in 1898 Sam Insull from the Commonwealth Edison Company was selected the same year that his hometown of Chicago hosted the June 7–9 event. The president would preside over the convention that included an introductory speech that summarized the major events of the year. Part of Insull's speech stunned attendees as he promoted the idea that electric companies were natural monopolies that should be regulated at the state rather than local level. Within fifteen years, his idea would sweep the nation.

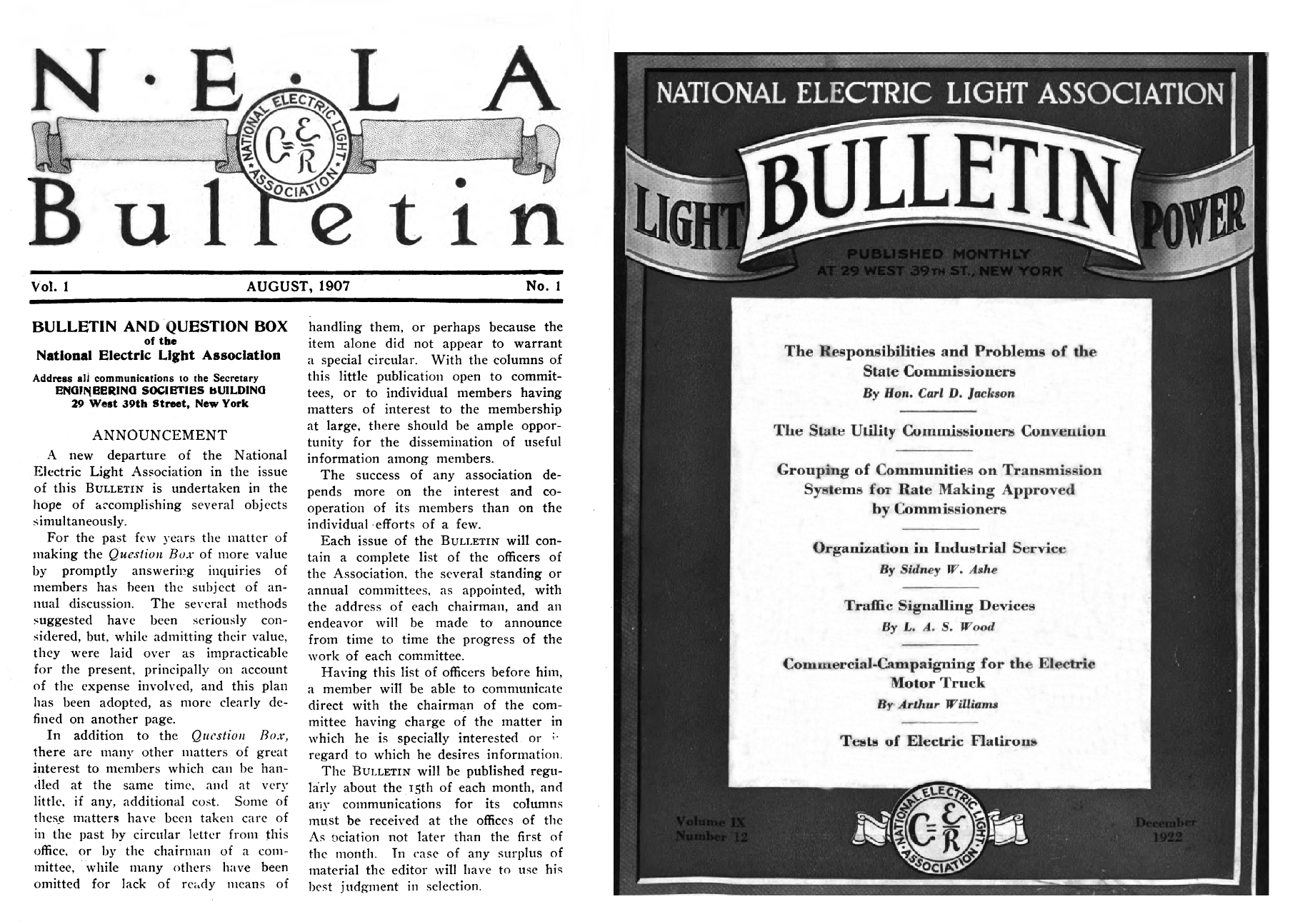
1907 and 1922 NELA Bulletins

The association maintained a modest year-round staff in New York City. They managed the group's budget, produced and distributed its reports and coordinated the conventions along with the host electric company. Prior to 1905, events were three days long but jumped to five-days by 1910. In 1907, the association introduced a monthly Bulletin that was distributed to all members. By 1910, the NELA was approaching 7,000 members, with its main office maintaining an exchange network of 114 trade and company journals being produced by its members in 1922.

Each convention was organized to draw prominent media coverage. Exhibitions that included dazzling displays of lighting and the latest electric appliances were modeled after the wildly popular 1893 Chicago World's Fair. It was always held at a high-profile luxury hotel. The convention's publicity included local and national celebrities. Opening ceremonies for the convention and exhibition included a welcome speech by the host city's mayor. Each day would have a morning and evening session that started with a live presentation of a major paper followed by a discussion on the topic by those in attendance. This was followed by entertainment, trips to the exhibition hall or local company's central electric power station.

== History ==
The National Electric Light Association's (NELA) formation and activities parallel the history of the U.S. electric industry and early development of energy use via electricity and its role in lighting. Electric lighting started with the use of Arc lamps, soon followed by Thomas Edison and Joseph Swan's incandescent light bulb. Most indoor lighting prior to this was done by wood fireplaces, candles, Whale oil, or kerosene in buildings. While the invention of arc lamps for street lighting in larger urban areas date back to the beginning of the 19th century. The first Power stations used hydro-electric power that evolved from watermills and centuries of mechanical development. Edison's Pearl Street Station was the first commercial steam powered central station where coal-fed boilers were used to produce electricity by generators.

On February 25, 1885, NELA held its first convention in Chicago Illinois with an estimated 90 people in attendance. Its first president was the Baltimore-based J. Frank Morrison known for his electric company and political experience, he served for the first three years. The founding meeting was organized by George S. Bowen, Franklin S. Terry, and Charles A. Brown. Franklin S. Terry was known for having organized a number of local and then regional Incandescent light bulb companies that included the National Electric Lamp Company that was merged with General Electric in 1911. Charles Brown was the head of the Western Electric Company, an electrical engineering and manufacturing company that served as the primary supplier to AT&T and the Bell Operating Companies. George Bowen was the founder of the Elgin Electric Light Company of Elgin Illinois and the head of the Chicago & Pacific railway company.

From its founding, until 1891, the NELA held semi-annual conventions, when it switched to annual events that were hosted by various cities across the United States. These conventions had a number of major goals that included formal presentations by scientists and engineers on the subjects of municipal street lights, residential lights, appliances, central power station construction and operations. The conventions also included major exhibitions of the latest appliances, motors, and equipment being produced by electric supply companies. In addition, the convention was meant to help newly formed electric generating companies discuss the latest innovations in the transmission of electricity. The conventions with its lighting exhibitions quickly became a major promotional tool for the electric industry that NELA would soon represent as membership expanded nationwide over the next few years. The turnout from around the country for the first convention convinced the attendees that this should become a regular event as a constitution was set up along with committees to coordinate future conventions.

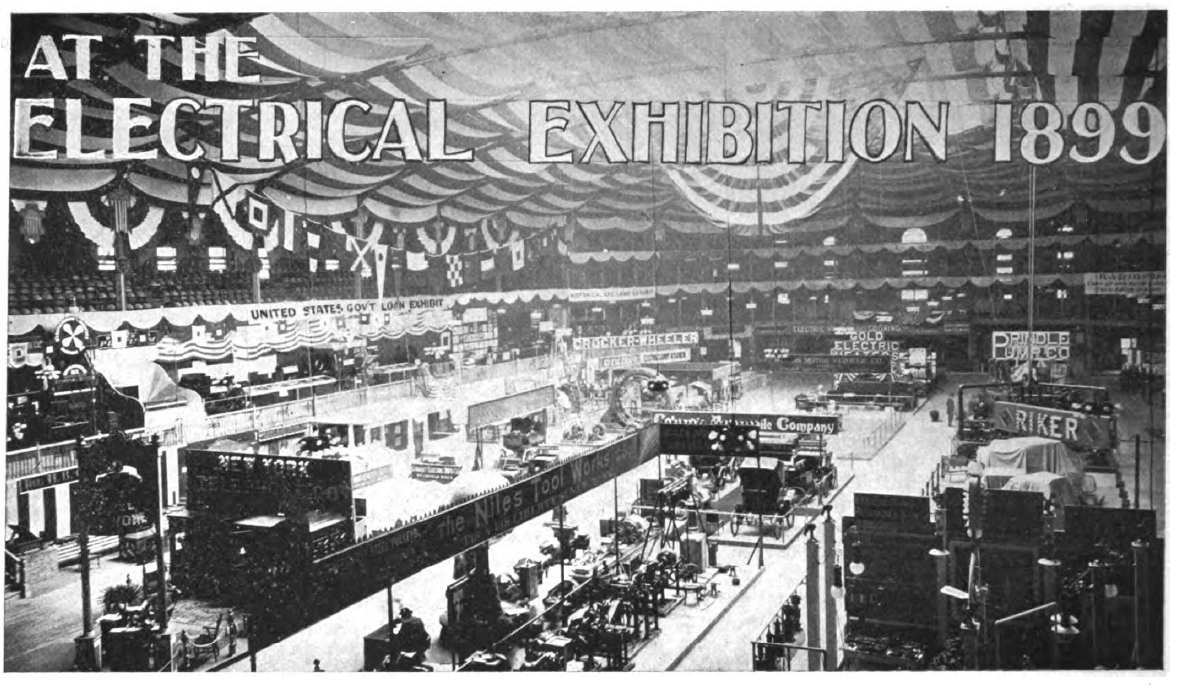
1899 NELA Convention at Madison Square Garden NY City

The second convention was August 18–19, 1885 in New York City. At this convention discussions were held about how to run a central power station, what kinds of members could join and debates between Electric arc vs. incandescent lighting. It was reported that roughly 350,000 arc and incandescent lights were already in operation around the country by 1886. The NELA's earliest public relations concern was with Insurance Companies as a result of Edison's public demonstrations known as the war of the currents. Its conventions were already starting to include exhibitions by supply companies. A number of committees were set up to deal with a broad variety of issues that were rapidly evolving at this early date of the industry's development with a strong focus on statistics, both as internal feedback for the industry but also for promotion.

By the third convention at Baltimore, finding a space big enough for all the exhibitors became a problem. The 1887 convention at Philadelphia was the first year the NELA took up the issue of Alternating current as a possible source of long-distance transmission and power, while the number of delegates jumped to 344 with its summer convention at Boston. Topics from how to insulate wires to storage batteries and motors were just beginning to be discussed. By 1888, one of the major issues was whether put all electrical wiring underground as was the demand in New York City and the growing problem of competing electric company lines on a single electric pole. During their 1889 convention in Chicago, the NELA statistics bureau pointed out that there were now 2.7 million arc and incandescent lights in the country or nearly a tenfold increase in three years. By 1892 the NELA had 26 Honorary members, 90 active members and 111 associate members in the association.

Between 1900 and 1902 the NELA conventions included 16 papers, 4 reports and their first discussions about appliances, standardized accounting practices and consumer complaints. In 1903, however, the number of published papers and reports started to skyrocket with 14 papers and 5 reports that were published in two volumes with major pieces on corporate consolidation and the promotion of electric signs. This grew again in 1904 with 16 papers, 18 reports 3 discussions and 3 additional special reports (appendixes) with the convention expanding to a week-long event. The highlights included presentations on legislation, long-distance transmission, electric heating, advertising methods and remote control of appliances. 1905 had 16 papers and 16 reports with more discussions on advertising and networking with alliances as well as a separate report on municipal ownership that was not released as well as the introduction to the idea of co-operation within the industry to organize and promote its agenda across a broad array of issues.

=== Electric Industry Co-operation 1890–1905 ===
NELA's conventions played a prominent role in bringing manufacturers, engineers and central station companies together to share information about issues the newly emerging industry faced. The three-day conventions would include around five technical papers and debates on lighting, motors, circuits and central station hardware that included the popular exhibits of equipment being produced. During this early period, there were no appliances being produced.

In one of its most important early contributions between 1890 and 1897, the NELA led a campaign that brought seven other national associations together, including the Underwriters National Electric Association, known today as the National Fire Protection Association, along with the insurance industry to produce the National Electrical Code.

In 1893, NELA's St. Louis convention had its first paper on Alternating Current, a presentation by Nikola Tesla that drew a large crowd and the morals of corporations. The presentation on Corporate Morals was NELA's first paper mentioning the tension between private vs. public ownership of electric generating facilities. At the time, only the very wealthiest members of the country could afford electric lighting while the only other market was for street lighting. A.E. Armstrong started his presentation on corporate morals with a joke about how a preacher told him that “the first corporation of which mention is ever made, and it is in the Bible, brought death and misery into the world, and that same history has ever repeated itself." He then acknowledged that he couldn't kill the preacher, but reassured him that his business wasn't actually a corporation, just a partnership. During his presentation, he spoke of moral obligations required by both the public and corporations, but also about tactics against the cooperative movement that distrusted corporations and how easily a few organized men can disperse mobs. NELA's president then stated that the industry had failed to understand or promote the importance of Corporate personhood to the public.

From 1894 until the end of the century, 42 formal papers and five lectures were presented at NELA conventions on technical subjects from Lightning arresters, meter rates, lighting large cities to electrical safety issues. In 1896, a few special topics stuck out like a lecture on Roentgen Rays, electrolysis and standardized electric sockets. Besides the usual business of the conventions which was handled by committee, the association's 1898 president, Samuel Insull introduced the heretical idea of Europe's public regulation of electric companies as a way to legitimize the industry's promotion of its natural monopoly business model.

Between 1900 and 1902 the NELA conventions included 16 papers, 4 reports and their first discussions about appliances, standardized accounting practices and consumer complaints. In 1903, however, the number of published papers and reports started to skyrocket with 14 papers and 5 reports that were published in two volumes with major pieces on corporate consolidation and the promotion of electric signs. This grew again in 1904 with 16 papers, 18 reports 3 discussions and 3 additional special reports (appendixes) with the convention expanding to a week long event. The highlights included presentations on legislation, long-distance transmission, electric heating, advertising methods and remote control of appliances. 1905 had 16 papers and 16 reports with more discussions on advertising and networking with alliances as well as a separate report on municipal ownership that was not released as well as the introduction to the idea of co-operation within the industry to organize and promote its agenda across a broad array of issues.

=== Electric Industry Co-operation Campaign 1905–07 ===
In February 1905, the light bulb industry's National Electric Lamp Association (not to be confused with the NELA) financed the formation of the Co-operative Electrical Development Association with the goal of making it the coordinator of a public relations campaign for the entire electric industry. In June 1905, J.R. Crouch, a prominent leader of the lamp industry (who helped form Nela Park) took the proposal to the National Electric Light Association's convention in Denver Colorado. After investigating the proposal for a year, NELA agreed to a three-year test period that set aside .02% of the industry's national income for the Co-operative plan with Crouse in charge.

On March 23, 1906, 65 representatives from major east coast electric companies met to hear Crouse's latest presentation on the Co-operation campaign that had been given a $60,000 budget to proceed for 3 years. Crouse made a 45-page presentation that included 10 papers on major aspects of the plan by the acting president of NELA, General Electric, Westinghouse, Western Electric and other segments of the industry as a whole. NELA then created a new Commercial Section committee with a budget of $30,000 for the Co-operative Electrical Development Association's office in New York City. The next step was to have Crouse announce details of the project at the June 1906 NELA Convention.

Crouse's presentation at the NELA convention for the Co-operative Electrical Development Association's goal to promote a dramatic expansion in the consumption of electricity by coordinating a nationwide public relations campaign aimed at the American public was the first step. He then laid out the major parts of the plan:

- The distribution of 26 pamphlets on best practices that would eventually go into the formation of a national handbook;
- The formation of a national quarterly magazine – the NELA Bulletin that started production in 1907;
- The formation of central station commercial departments that integrate their work with national advertising agencies;
- A nationwide news clipping and Press Bureau to monitor public opinion and distribute PR pieces to the national media;
- Coordinated advertising campaigns between trade journals, appliance wholesalers, manufacturers and electric companies;
- Establishment of a statistics department to distribute and promote industry growth and projected goals;
- Networking with other trades, the country's magazine industry and the Chamber of Commerce;
- Networking with the architectural and engineering communities on electrical designs in new and old buildings.

The movement's slogan would be: All Together, All the Time, for Everything Electrical. As part of the plan, one of NELA's largest ongoing campaigns against Municipal ownership which had its own committee was renamed to the Committee on Public Policy during the convention. In 1907 J.R Crouse became seriously ill so the industry partially shelved the larger project, not just because of him but due to the dramatic changes taking place nationwide - The change in how the industry would be regulated.

=== The electric power industry gets regulated 1907 ===
Prior to 1907, city governments across the country were in charge of electric company's licenses (franchises) and setting rates. The country's central stations were tiny compared to modern electric power companies, with larger cities having a number of competing companies. This politicized situation led to major scandals from New York to San Francisco. One public reaction to this was the growing number of cities like San Francisco, Cleveland and Seattle that built their own power stations. The other response was regulation reform which was first proposed by Samuel Insull in 1898 at NELA's convention. His proposal was to shift regulatory control from the city to the state in exchange for monopoly control over service territories. In 1905, the National Civic Federation did a two-year investigation of municipal vs. private electric stations. They ended up promoting Insull's plan which he'd gotten from Europe. In 1907, model legislation giving regulatory control of all "public utilities" to the state was adopted by Wisconsin, New York and Massachusetts. It quickly spread nationwide.

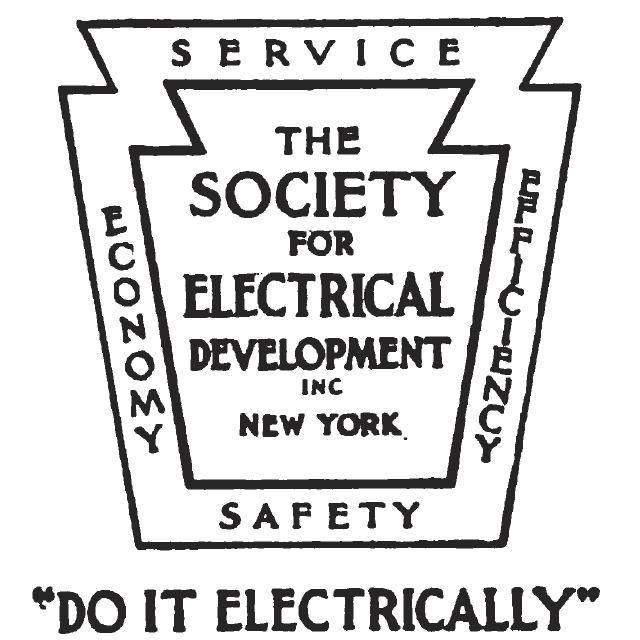
Society For Electrical Development Inc. logo

In September 1912 industry leaders met at the NELA's Association Island (located on Lake Ontario) and agreed to restart J.R. Crouse's national public relations campaign as laid out in 1906. The new organization, known as the Society for Electrical Development Inc., with an initial budget of $150,000 had its first meeting on October 12 at the offices of the National Electric Light Association. A committee led by H.L. Doherty from the association Island meeting setup its bylaws including the twenty board of governors placed in charge that were selected from across the entire electrical industry. In September 1913, a second meeting chaired by NELA's president J.B. McCall known as Camp Co-operation was held. Attendees included the head of National City Bank, General Electric, Westinghouse, Western Electric, Senators, academics, patent lawyers and state regulatory commissioners. Even Thomas Edison sent a letter in support. The four-day retreat's informal settings were similar to the Bohemian Club. Twenty prominent speakers from the industry and government spoke including Samuel Insull and J.R. Crouse. Details of the event were published and circulated to NELA members nationwide. There were four "Camp Co-operation" meetings held at Association Island between 1912 and 1920.

The Society held a competition that ended on May 5, 1913, for the best slogan and logo with the winner being "Do It Electrically". James Wakemen was made the manager of the Society with Henry L Doherty president. By June 1913 the Society had 180 members with and $125,000 pledged. During the June NELA convention an example from Cleveland known as the "People's Electrical Page" with a full page of advertisements and publicity pieces three times a week by local companies was demonstrated as a new model for coordinating newspaper content. The ad campaigns for residential and commercial clients included 25 rotating subjects during the year ending with Christmas. By 1917, the Society's annual Christmas campaign that started on November 29 sent its 1,300 members 450,000 pieces of material with their annual Electrical Prosperity Week. One of the most popular items were stamps (see color stamp image below) as well as colorful window posters and movies.

The 38th annual NELA convention was held between June 7 and 11, 1915 in San Francisco at the same time as the Panama Pacific International Exposition. By 1915, the NELA had 29 standing committees made up of 500 working members that produced 2,500 pages of reports and 17 technical papers. Besides the regular convention where the papers and reports were shared, many other events took place, including daily ceremonies at the Expo with special light shows, parades, tours, and evening balls. A specially lit electric temple was erected in downtown Union Square, while addresses by industry leaders, regulators and politicians covering a wide variety of topics including the state of the west coast's massive hydro-electric development. One of the four major NELA sections on accounting practices demonstrated the latest technique of punched cards and accounting machines to handle large numbers of ratepayers, another section demonstrated the latest electric cars, while an entirely new section was opened up to begin active relationships with technical colleges and institutions nationwide. Reports claimed that NELA's total membership at over 13,000 by the time of the convention with its public relations section being increasingly important.

=== Goodwin Plan - California Electric Co-operation Campaign ===
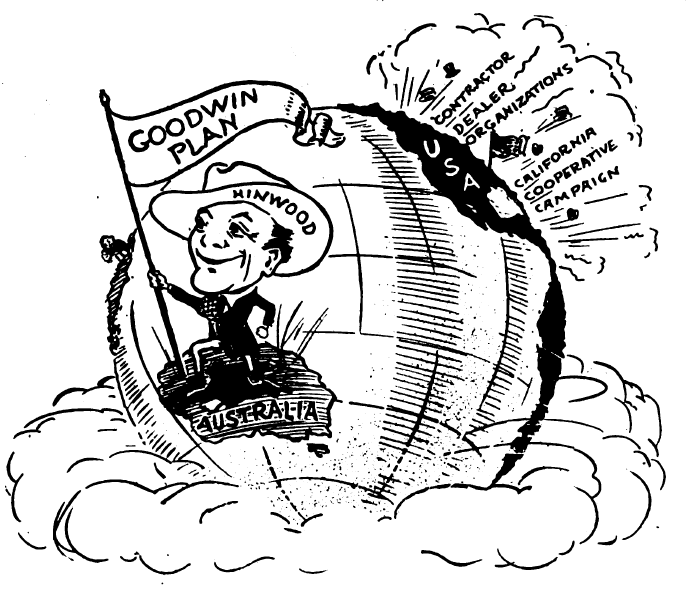
Goodwin California Campaign 1920

During World War I, William L. Goodwin conceived of the California Electric Co-operation campaign to coordinate appliance sales between major segments of the electric industry. The campaign spread across California, Australia and then to the rest of the U.S. via the industry's trade journals. The model was first devised in Fresno California using Hoover vacuum cleaners but was used for other appliances as well. The plan started with local newspaper advertisements developed by the manufacturer for use by the electric company. The manufacturer would then also work with the local wholesaler of the product to make sure supplies were in place when the campaign began. Trained door to door salesmen driving company cars with logos of the product used the electric company's database so the peddlers knew the names of the customers when they knocked on their door. The last part of the deal was to sell the appliance on credit. Five dollars down and it's yours for monthly payments. The strategy increased appliance sales five times higher than appliance stores and resulted in increased electric use for the utility company.

=== 1925 San Francisco Convention ===
NELA's 1925 annual convention was held between June 16 and 19 in San Francisco California. Besides being two weeks later than usual, it just happened to coincide with the San Francisco Board of Supervisors vote the day after the convention that gave away 30 years of work by the city to build its own municipal power facility. On May 26, 1898, after years of political struggle, San Francisco passed a new city charter calling for the public ownership of all utility services. It was in need of a new water supply and the replacement of the corrupt Spring Valley Water Company. The city identified a candidate site in Yosemite National Park for the construction of a new water and power supply known as Hetch Hetchy. It would take years of fighting the water company, private interests and John Muir before the dust settled and construction began in 1914.

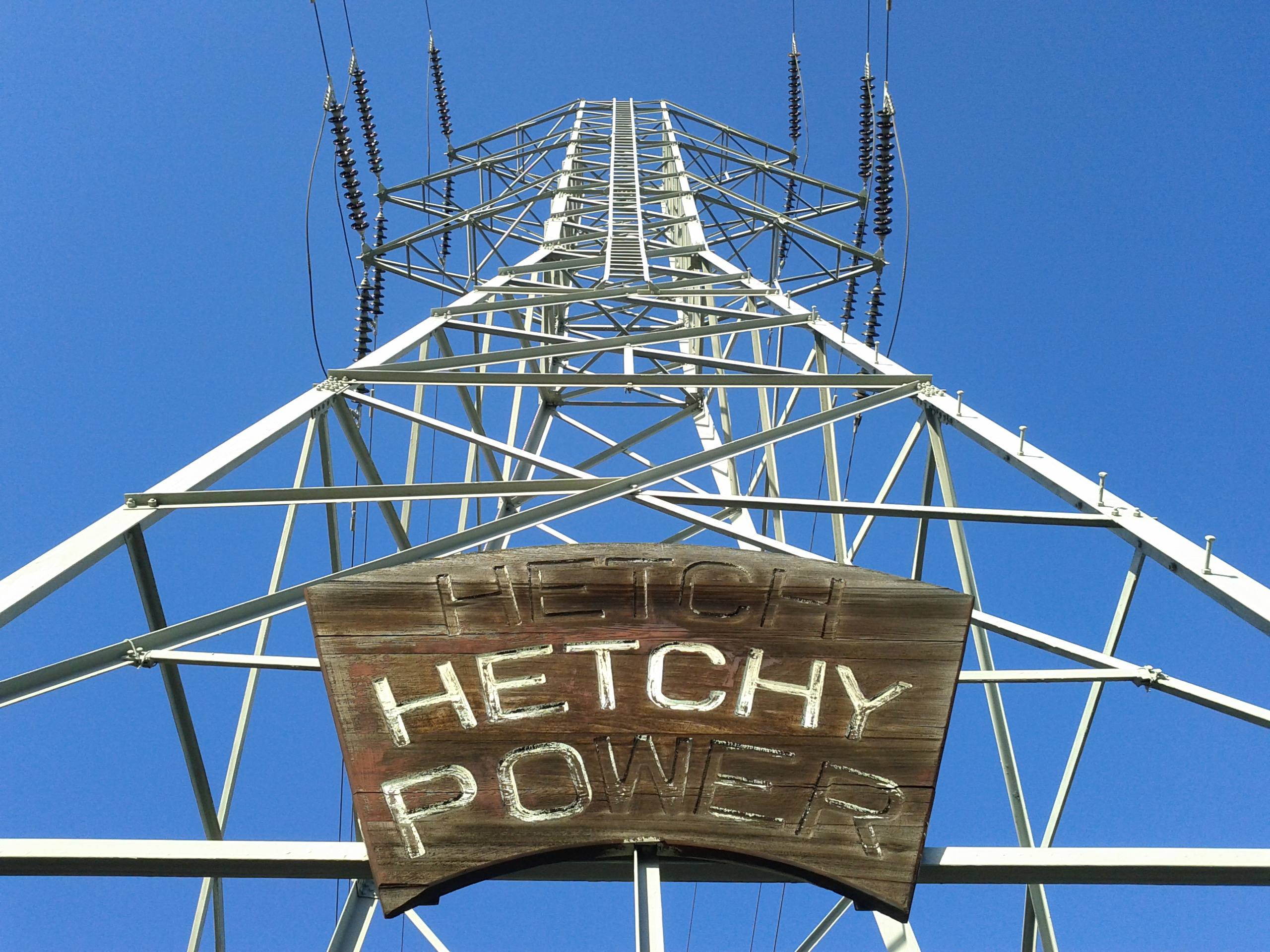
Last Hetch Hetchy power tower Newark, CA

By the spring of 1925, the dam was complete, the city's new water supply was almost done and power lines had been strung within a mile of a newly constructed Pacific Gas & Electric Company substation, when the mayor lied about the city running out of wire. With 4,000 electric company executives from across the U.S. in town, the conservative San Francisco Chronicle filled its front pages with speeches touting the benefits of private ownership of electricity. On June 20, openly defying the 1913 federal Raker Act that banned private sale of Hetch Hetchy power, the Board of Supervisors voted to lease all power from the facility to the Pacific Gas & Electric Company. Attempts to reverse the contract, including a 1940 U.S. Supreme Court decision, and decades of political campaigns have failed to break the agreement.

=== Federal Trade Commission Investigation ===
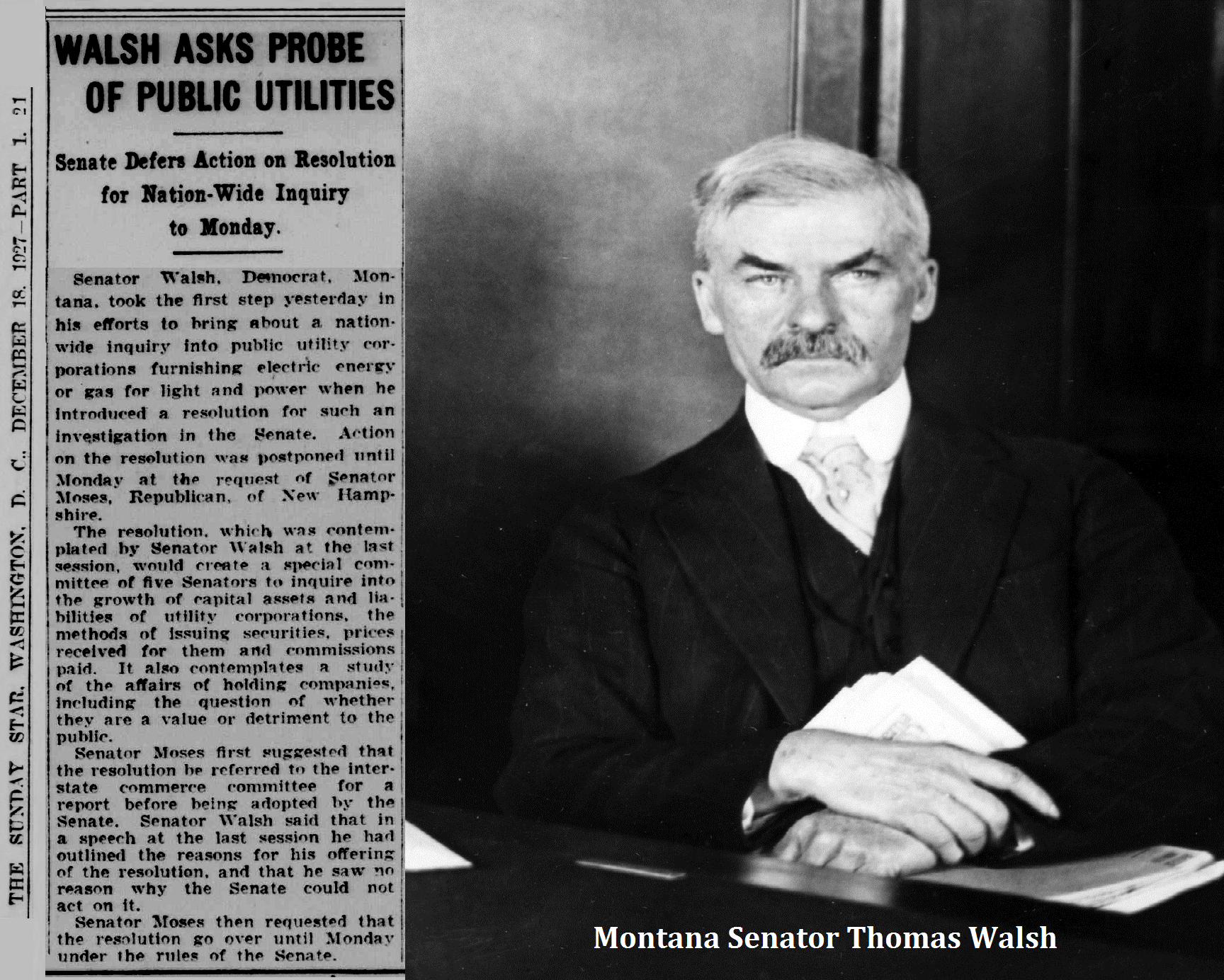
Senator Walsh Announces Resolution for Probe of the Electric Industry 12-18 1927

According to the March 21st, 1927 New York Herald Tribune, "Power Trust" opponents met on March 11 in the Washington D.C. office of Nebraska's Republican Senator George W. Norris. Norris, along with former Pennsylvania governor Gifford Pinchot, U.S. senators, house members, "leaders of radical organizations and movements" came together to plan a government ownership drive. In reality, the group was developing plans for a senate investigation of the electric industry. In June, just as the Federal Trade Commission's (FTC) report on the country's most controversial electric holding company, the Electric Bond and Share Company was released, Montana Senator Thomas J. Walsh introduced a resolution calling for a Senate investigation of the country's electric utilities. The reasons for Senator Walsh's investigation was clear:

- General Electric's (GE) central role in the 1925 global Phoebus cartel's planned obsolescence of light bulbs
- The 1926 U.S. Dept. of Justice light bulb price-fixing lawsuit (United States v. General Electric Co.)
- GE's ownership of over 10% of the country's electric utilities via its Electric Bond and Share Company
- GE's leading role with NELA in the long-standing war against municipal ownership of electric stations
- State attempts to regulate holding company abuses had failed
- while over 95% of America's 6.5 million farmers and most of the country's urban poor had no access to electricity

Walsh's initial legislation failed but the coalition did not give up. He reintroduced his resolution on December 17, 1927 that received positive support from newspapers around the country. The electric industry was initially opposed to any investigation but then reversed its strategy, using its senate allies to amend the resolution, transferring the investigation to the Federal Trade Commission. On February 15, 1928, the Walsh resolution, or Senate Resolution 83 passed with the requirement for public hearings. It directed the Federal Trade Commission to investigate the U.S. electric industry and make monthly written status reports to the Senate on the following:

- The capital assets and liabilities of gas and electric holding companies or any of its subsidiaries doing interstate or international business;
- all financial activities surrounding the above-mentioned corporation's securities or stocks;
- all connections between stockholders, holding companies and subsidiaries;
- all services, earnings, and expenses between holding companies and its subsidiaries; and
- the value or detriment to the public of holding companies and any proposed corrective legislation.

And

- The utility industry and its association's effort to manipulate opinion of public ownership of electrical generation; and
- since 1923, any attempt to influence the outcome of federal elections.

The commission's public hearings started on March 8, 1928, and ended on December 12, 1935, spanning three different presidential administrations. The investigation was overseen by the Federal Trade Commission's Chief Counsel Robert E. Healy and Commissioner Edgar A. McCulloch (former Chief Justice of the Arkansas Supreme Court). It was one of the largest federal investigations ever undertaken with a starting budget of $85,000 that increased to over $1 million annually. The seven-year (1928–1936) investigation produced 63,000 pages of testimony and 6,000 exhibits in 94 volumes. The commission sent out dozens of accountants to all 48 states to inspect the financial records of 29 holding companies, 70 sub-holding companies and 278 gas & electric companies with assets of over $19 billion. In addition to the monthly reports, the commission also produced annual summaries of the probe. The 94 volumes are broken down as follows:

- Volumes 1–19 March 1928 – Jan. 1930: the National Electric Light Assoc., committee members, and affiliated company activities.
- Volumes 20–80 Feb. 1930 – Sept. 1935: investigations of specific electric companies.
- Volumes 81–84 A-D Oct. – Dec. 1935: the Natural Gas Industry investigation, conclusions and recommendations.
- Volumes containing Exhibits Numbers 1–4047.
- Volumes 69-A through 81-A Sept. 1934 – Dec. 1935: seven special reports including the FTC's conclusions and Recommendations.
- Volume 69-A 9-15 1934: Pros and cons of federal ownership
- Volume 71-A 11-15 1934: Propaganda Part I: Efforts by Associations and Agencies of Electric and Gas Utilities to Influence Public Opinion
- Volume 71-B 11-15 1934: Propaganda Part II: Index of names and exhibits Vol 1-20
- Volume 72-A 6-17 1935: Financial Investigation Phase of Holding Companies
- Volume 73-A 1-28 1935: Conclusions and Recommendations for governing holding Companies
- Volume 77-A 5-16 1935: Propaganda Index for testimony & exhibits Vol. 21-45
- Volume 81-A 11-14 1935: Propaganda Part III Efforts by Electric and Gas Utilities to Influence Public Opinion

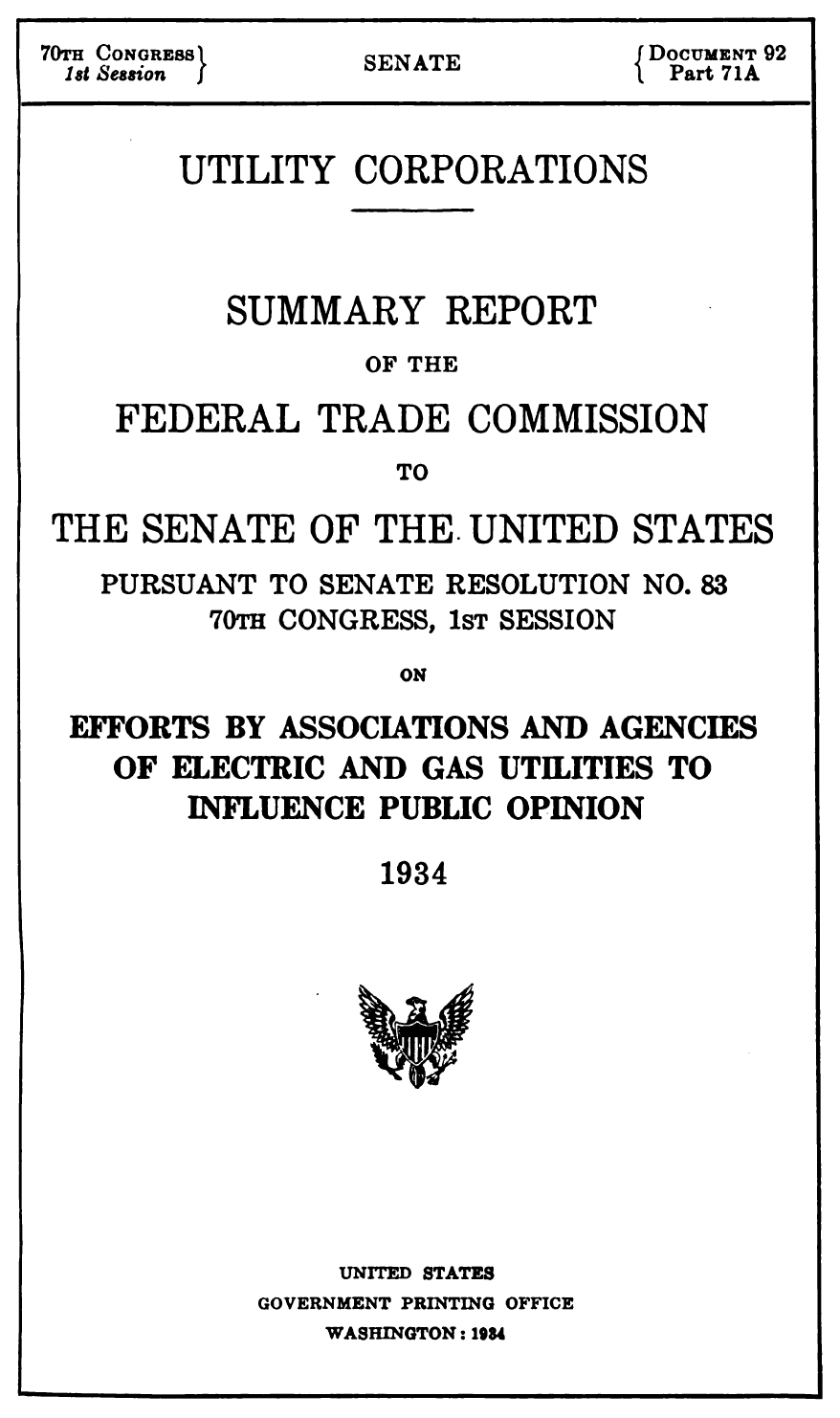
Federal Trade Commission Propaganda Report - Efforts by Associations and Agencies of Electric and Gas Utilities to Influence Public Opinion 1934

The Federal Trade Commission's final conclusions called the electric utility industry's practices "evil" and recommended that holding companies working across state lines be broken up. The industry's decades-old "propaganda" campaign which was led by NELA and the very largest holding companies actively worked to undermine public ownership of power stations, using every conceivable strategy and medium. The report states that "the record establishes that, measured by quantity, extent, and cost, this was probably the greatest peace-time propaganda campaign ever conducted by private interests in this country. The NELA's handbook was used to train thousands of industry proponents of private ownership. Its tactics included fear-based red-baiting attacks that were deployed using every possible medium. The campaign included both free and paid for advertising in the hundreds of thousands of pieces costing ten's of millions of dollars annually, and in most cases paid for out of the ratepayers pocket. Millions more were spent to influence government officials and elections. From ownership of newspapers, and radio stations, all the way to editorial control over the nation's textbooks, the industry promoted itself while leaving no stone unturned in its brutal attack against the country's municipally owned power stations.

Once the investigation was underway, most of the country's newspapers went silent on the investigation. On May 5, 1928 Senator George Norris attacked the press for failing to cover the dramatic issues being exposed during the public hearings. One major controversy was the industry's veto power over what was allowed in the country's school text books. As a result, the National Education Association denounced this activity.

One of the largest parts of the investigation focused on the industry's decades-old propaganda war hidden behind their deceptive "co-operation campaign". The multiple volumes and thousands of pages of exhibits and testimony on the subject was summarized by Jack Levin in one of the few books to have ever been written about the results of the FTC's investigation. In Chapter twelve, he detailed how NELA's national network of Public Utility Information Committees stigmatized the democrats, republicans and cities supporting public power as un-American, resulting in the country's media freely giving away ten's of thousands of stories mixed in with the $30 million a year advertising budget of the industry.

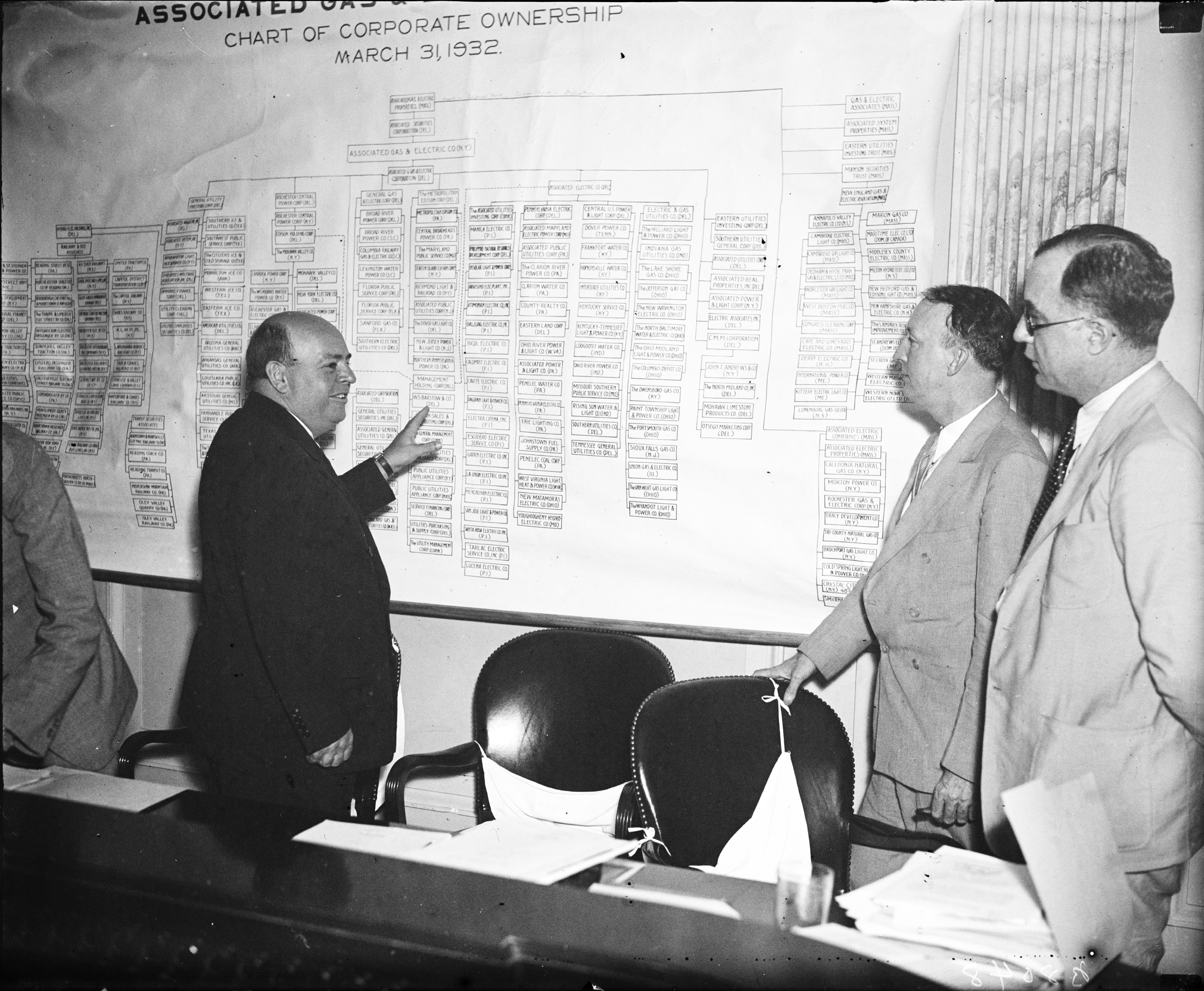
Howard Hopson explains AG&E Holding Company organization at Senate Hearing

The investigation concluded on the last day of 1935. According to the FTC, the investigation resulted in the "enactment of such remedial legislation as the Securities Act of 1933, the Public Utility Holding Company Act of 1935, the Federal Power Act of 1935, and the Natural Gas Act of 1938.” The Investigation resulted in 94 volumes of reports up to 2,000 pages in length, with its last report issued in 1936. On March 12, 1935, President Franklin D. Roosevelt released a report based on the Federal Trade Commission investigation he commissioned by the National Power Policy Committee. This report became the template for the Public Utility Holding Company Act of 1935.

=== Closure ===
On April 4, 1932, three major utility groups rejoined NELA after its executive director Paul Clapp resigned. Clapp was associated with Samuel Insull, who was a past president of NELA and one of its most powerful leaders. Four days later, Insull's massive Middle West Utility empire failed to obtain a critical loan from National City Bank. On April 16, Middle West which was made up of 24 holding companies and 239 operating companies, covering 30 U.S. states went into receivership. Two months later, Insull fled to Europe after resigning his chairmanship of Middle West. Its bankruptcy was the largest electric company failure in U.S. history until the 2001 collapse of Enron.

During NELA's June 1932 convention, a committee was formed to investigate the potential of merging with the Association of Edison Illuminating Companies. NELA was dissolved on February 15, 1933, at the end of its 56th convention in New York City. However, on January 12, 1933, the Edison Electric Institute was formed to take over as the association representing the U.S. electric industry.

== Sources ==
- Early Incandescent Lamps
- Electric Charges: The Social Construction of Rate Systems
- FTC Milestones: Making the case for reform of public utility holding company laws
- 1928–35 Federal Trade Commission Annual Reports document the 7-year investigation of the National Electric Light Association and the electric industry

== Gallery ==
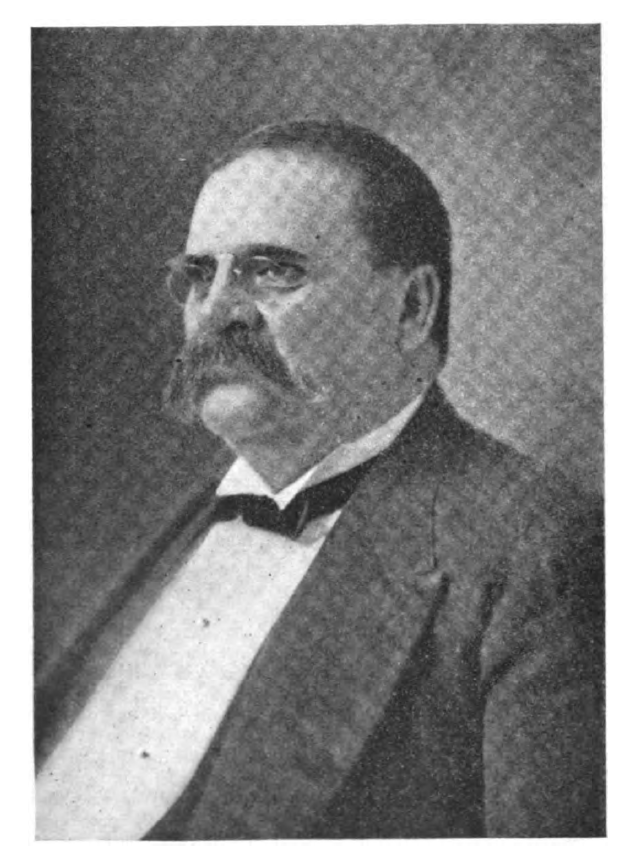
J. Frank Morrison First president of National Electric Light Association 1885

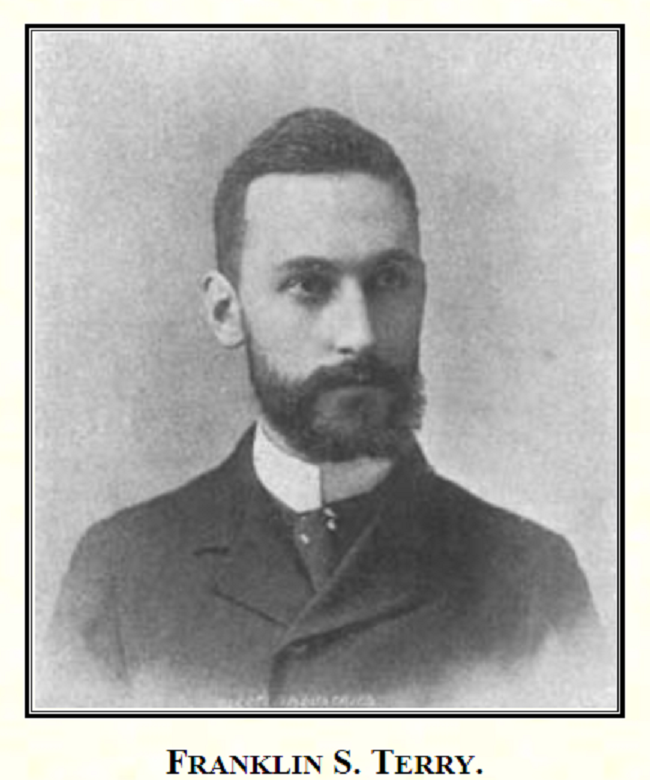
Franklin S. Terry Co-founder of the NELA c. 1892

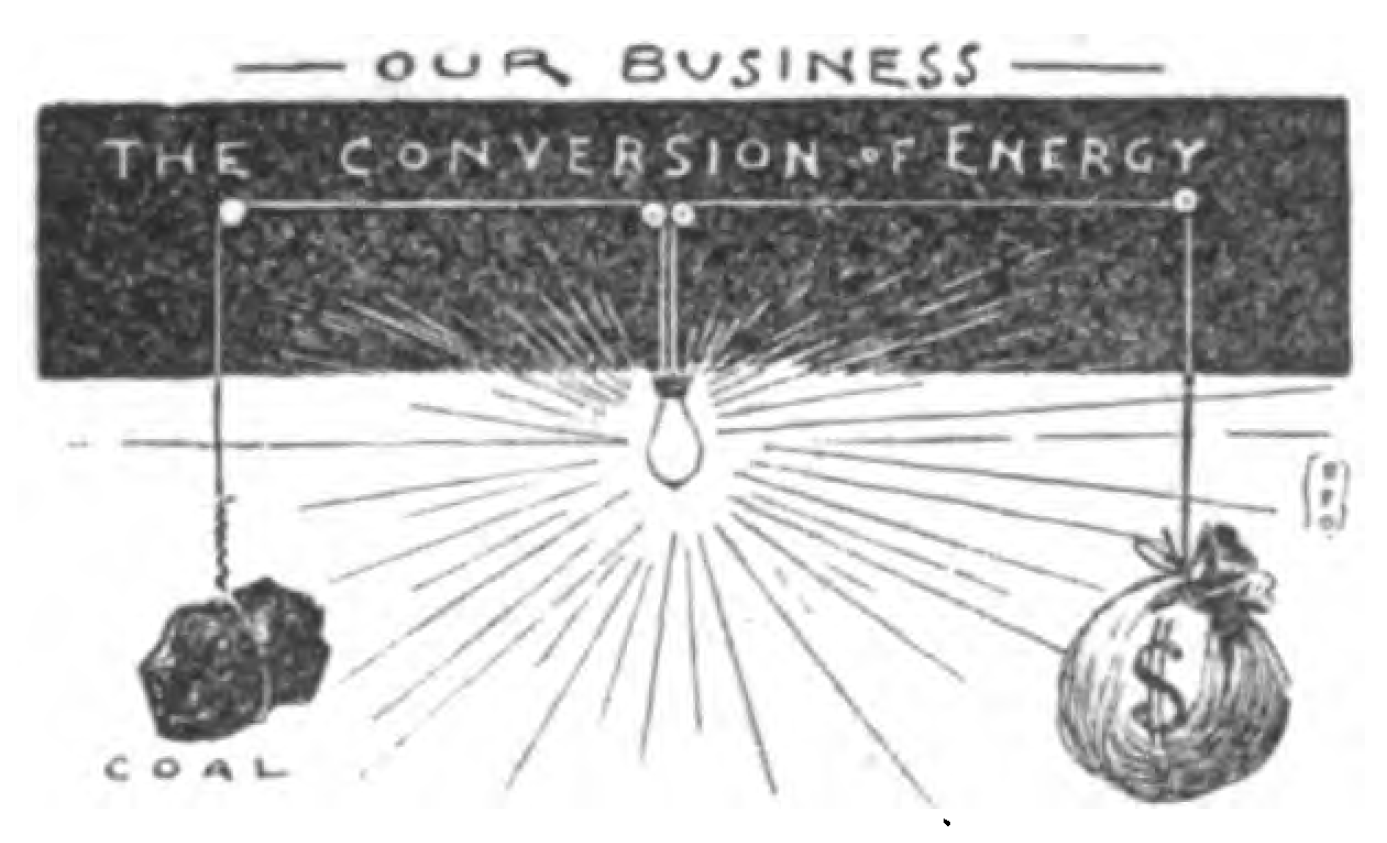
NELA history article: Our business is making money c. 1892

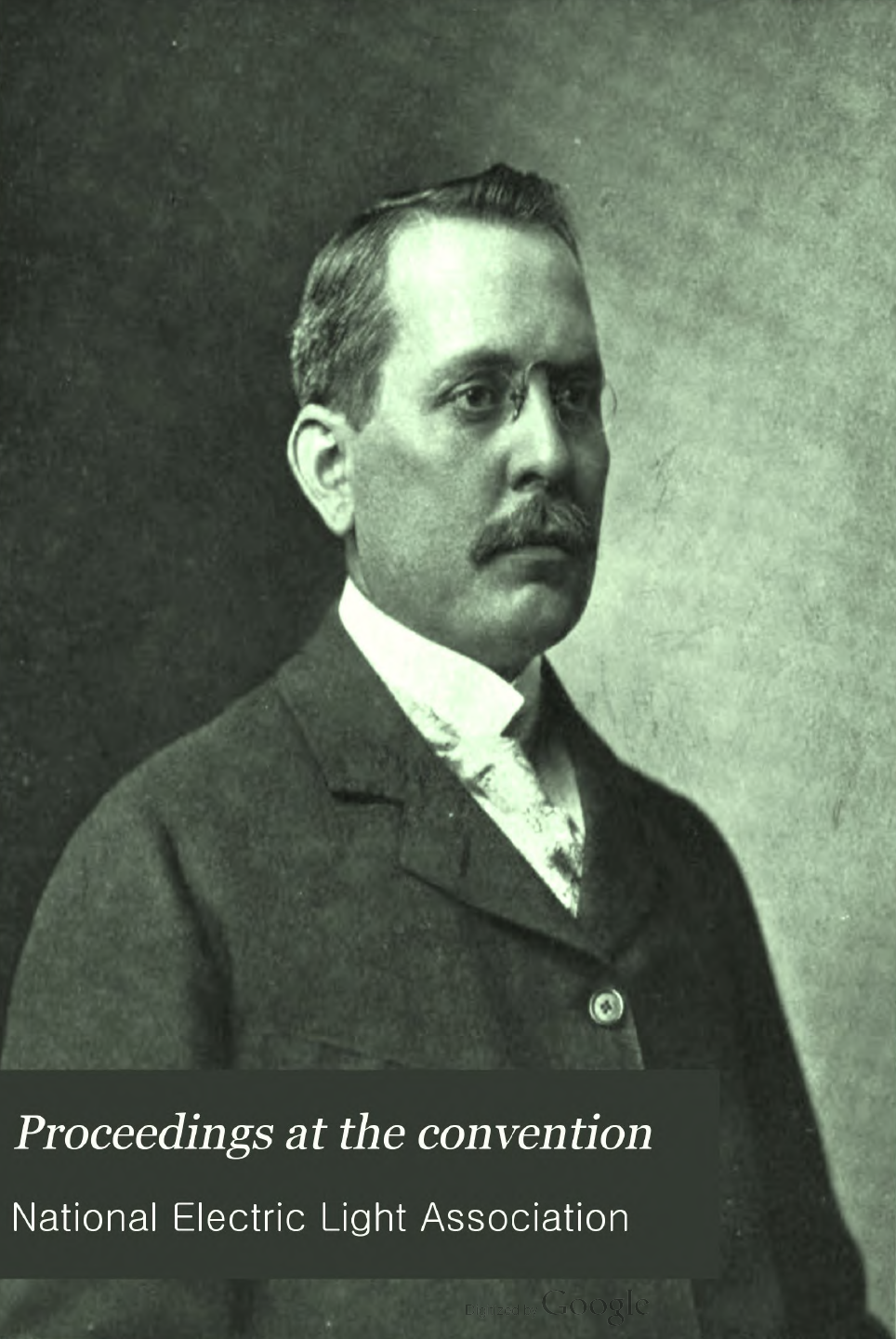
NELA Convention Book Cover of Samuel Insull – June 1898

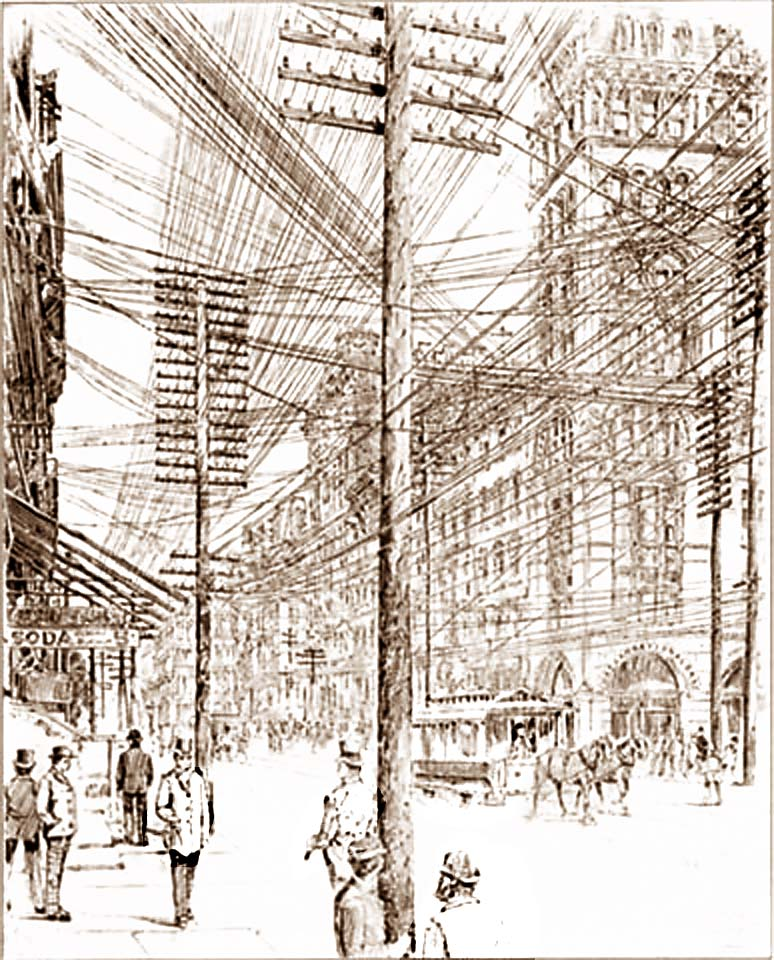
Competing electric company lines in New York City in the 1890s

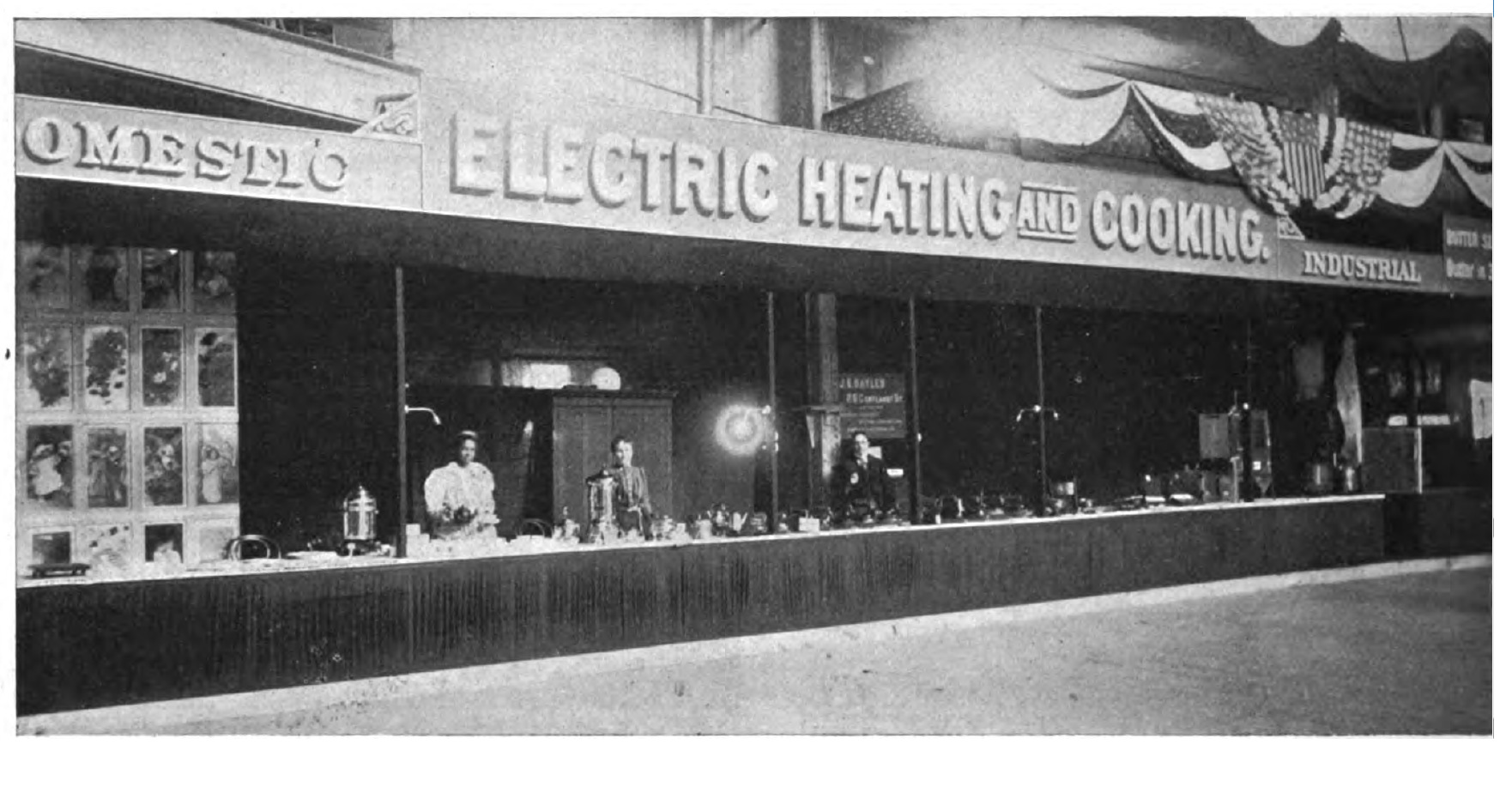
New York City NELA Convention at Madison Square Gardens c. 1899

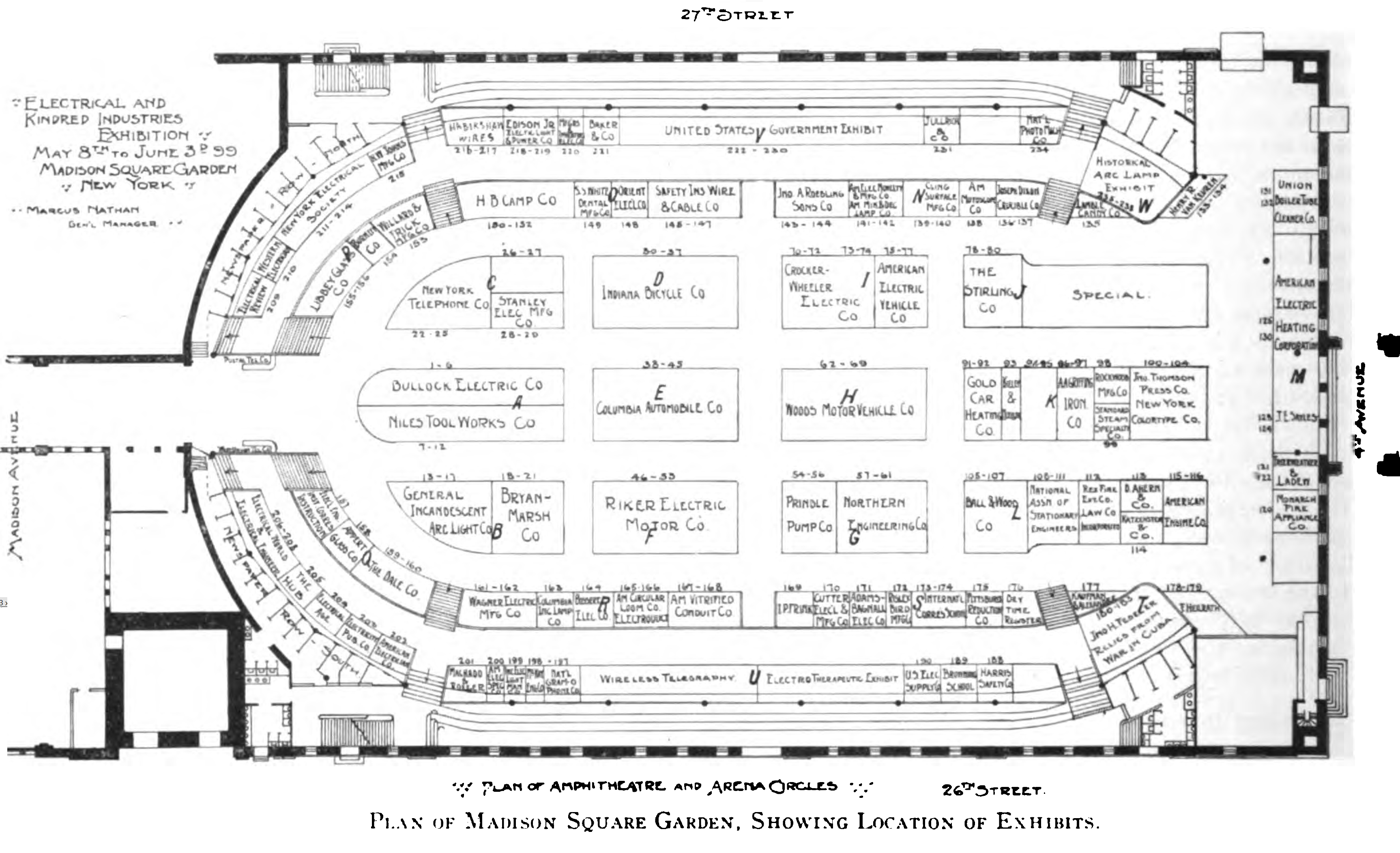
NELA Convention Layout at Madison Square Gardens c. 1899

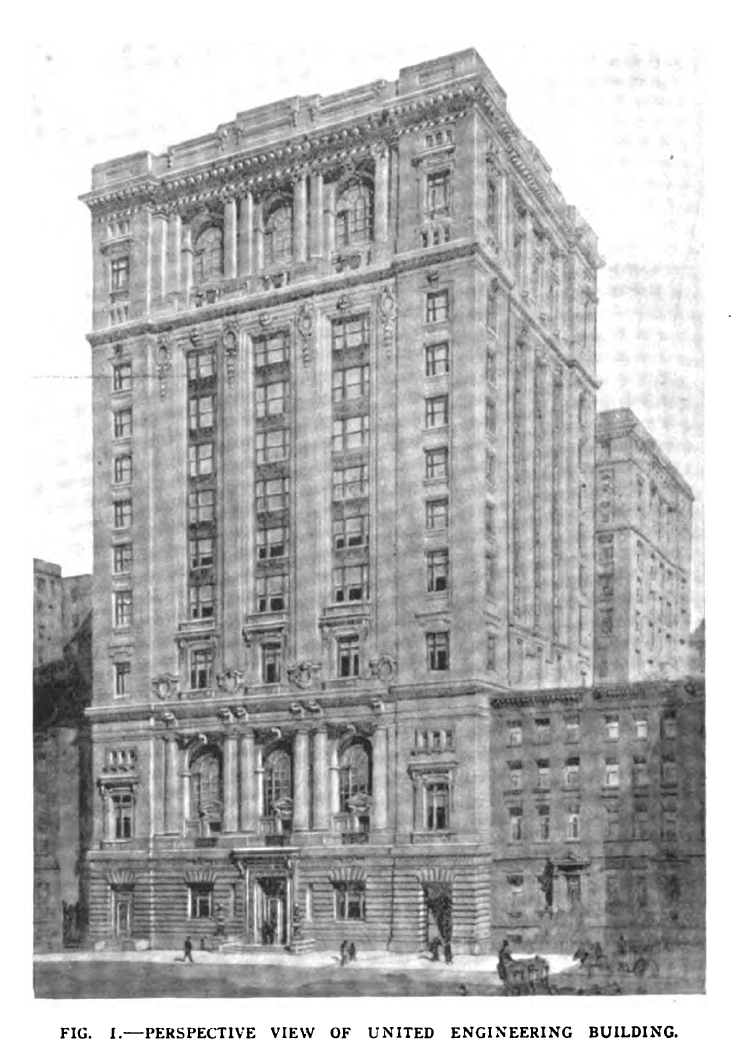
United Engineering Building NY City: headquarters for NELA c. 1905

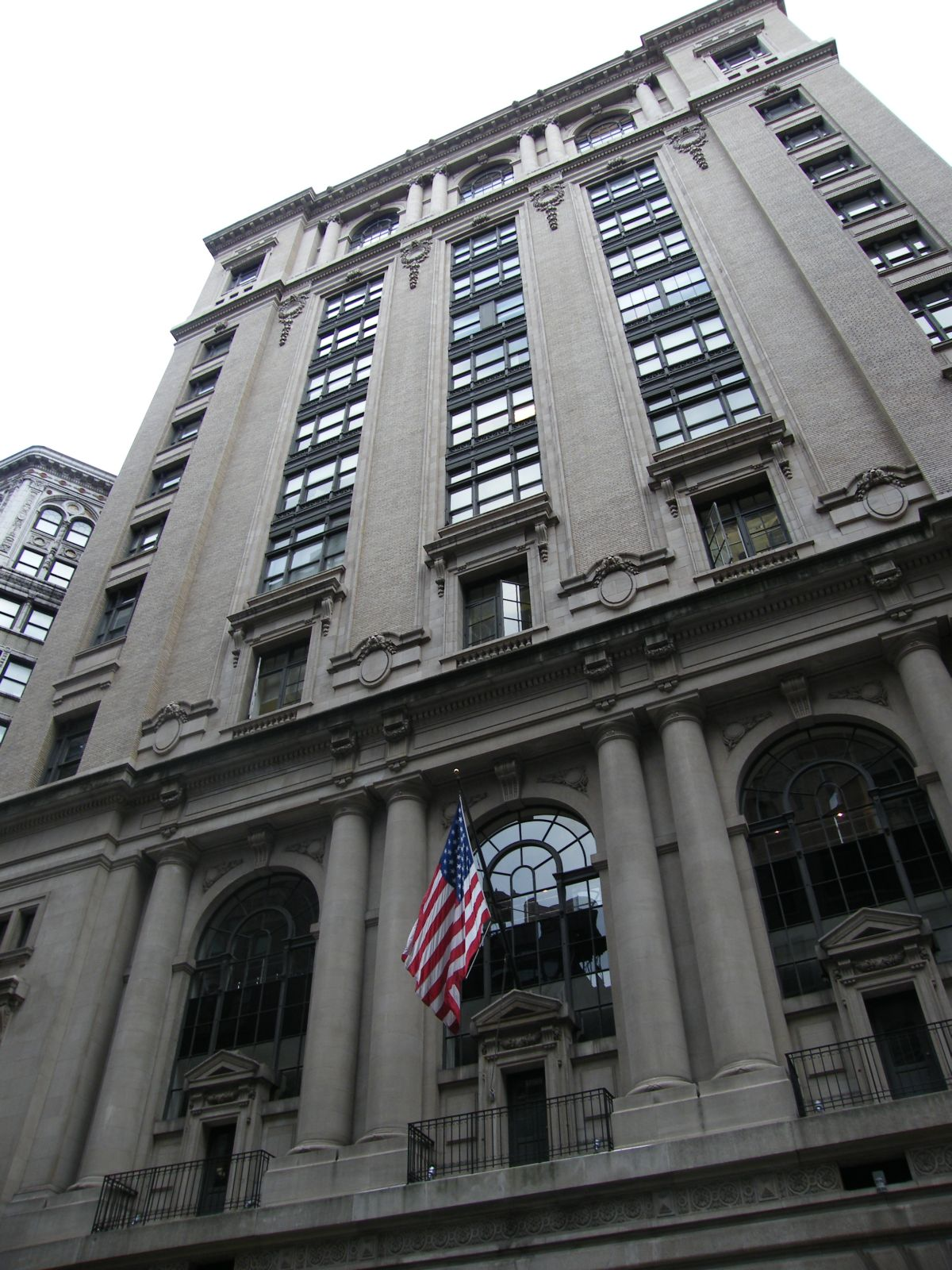
United Engineering Building today – Engineering Societies' Building and is now a historic building

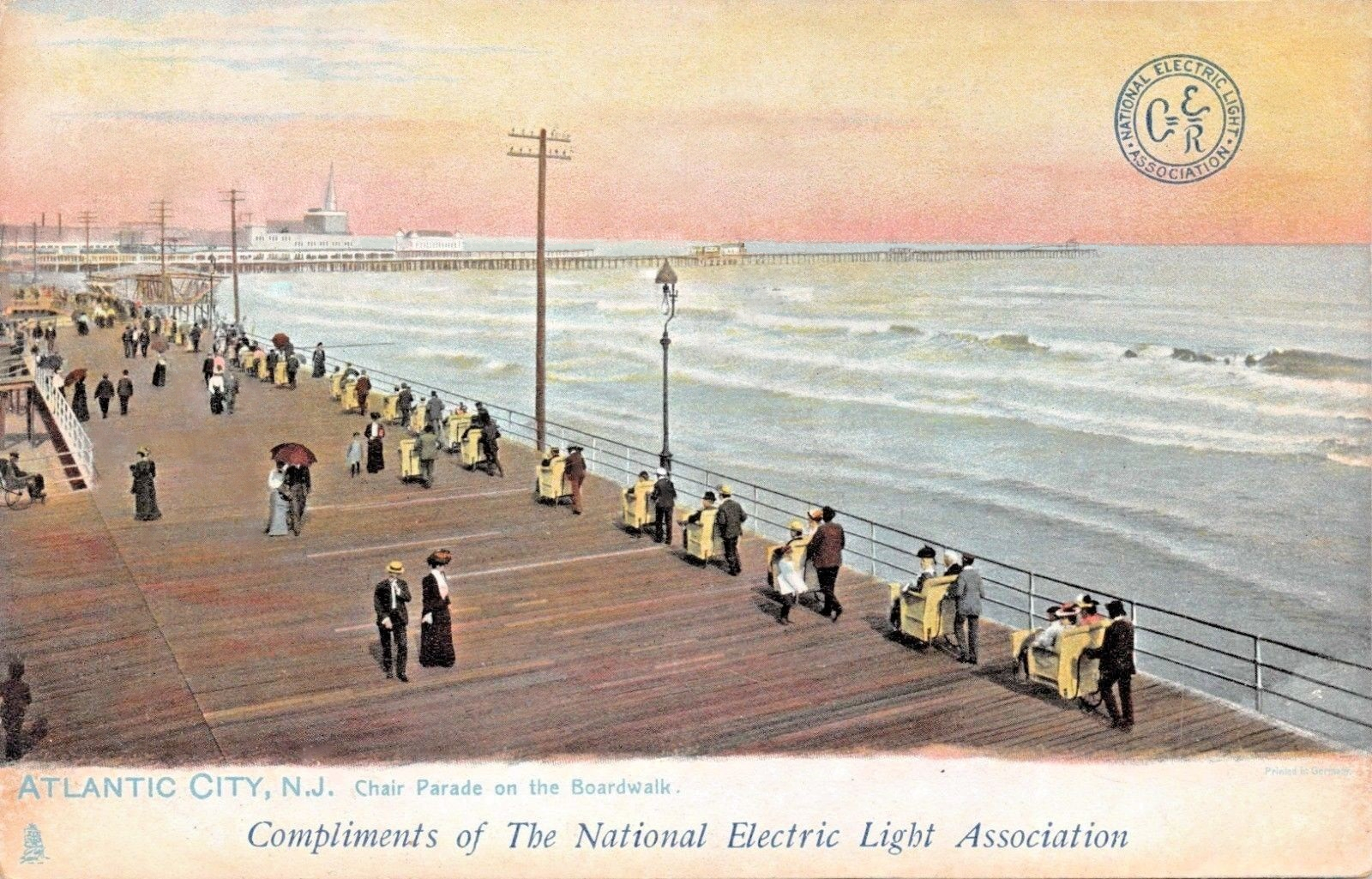
NELA Convention Post Card Atlantic City NJ c. 1906

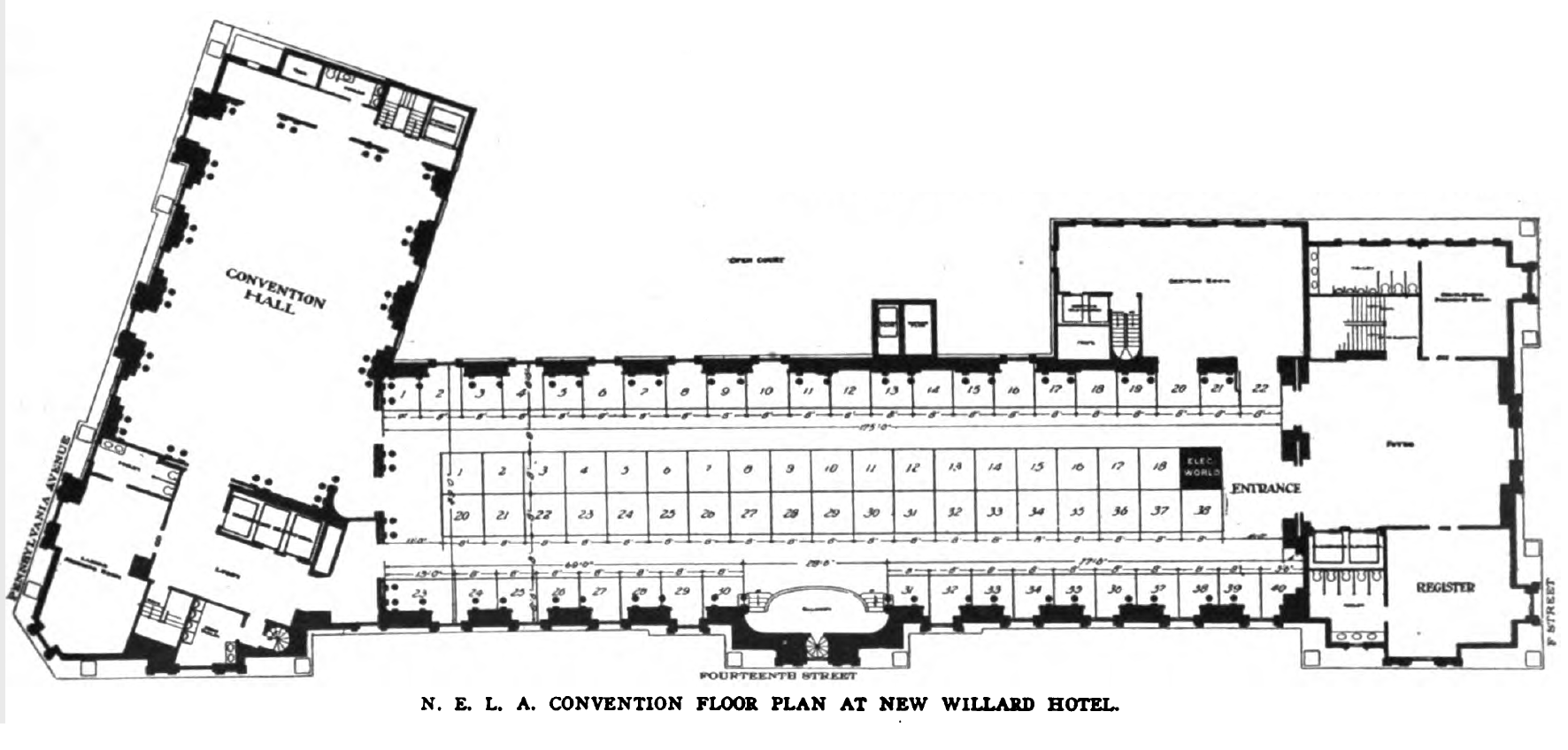
Washington D.C. NELA Convention Floor Plan – New Willard Hotel – 1907

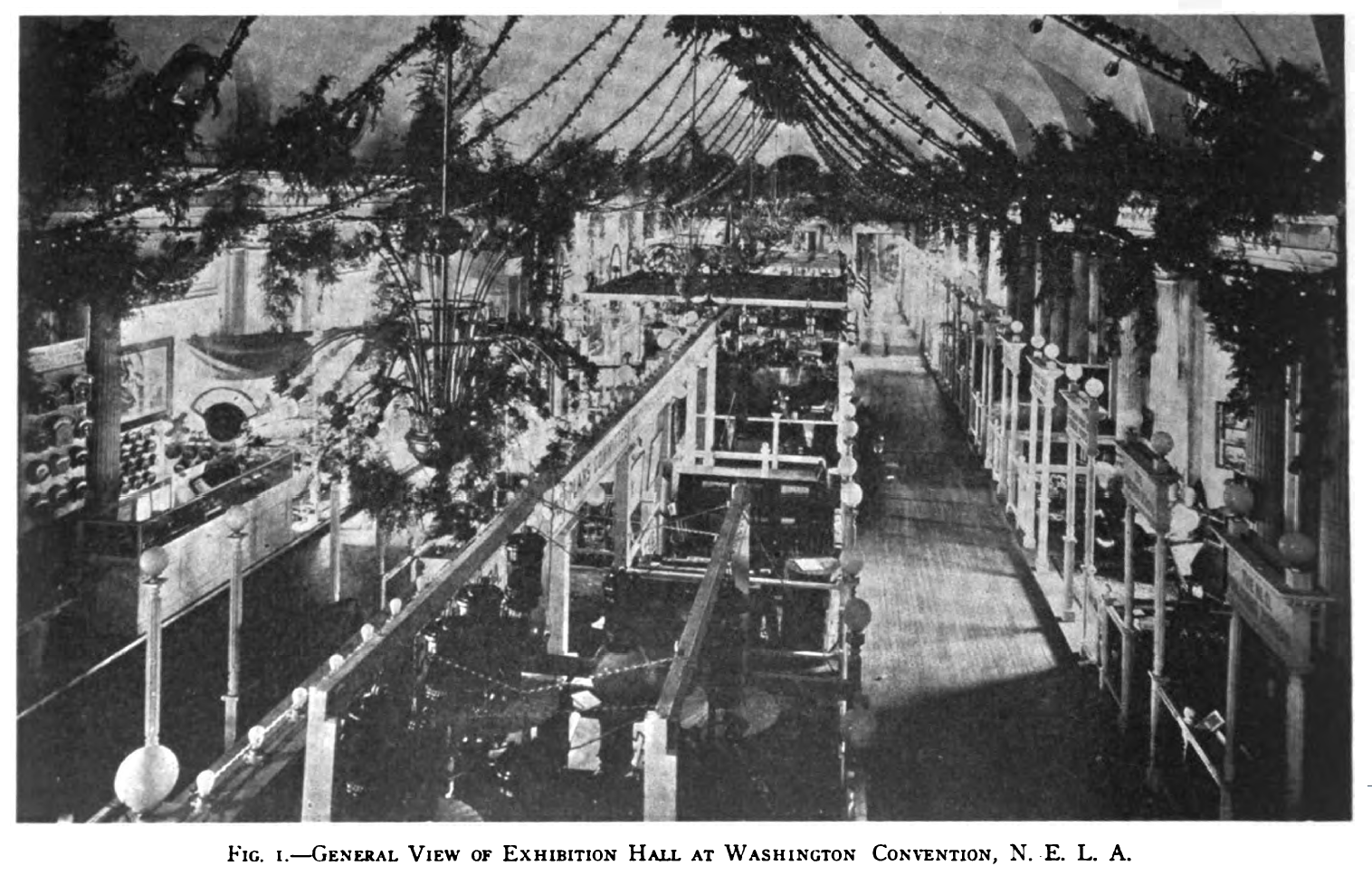
NELA Exhibition Hall – Washington D.C. – 1907

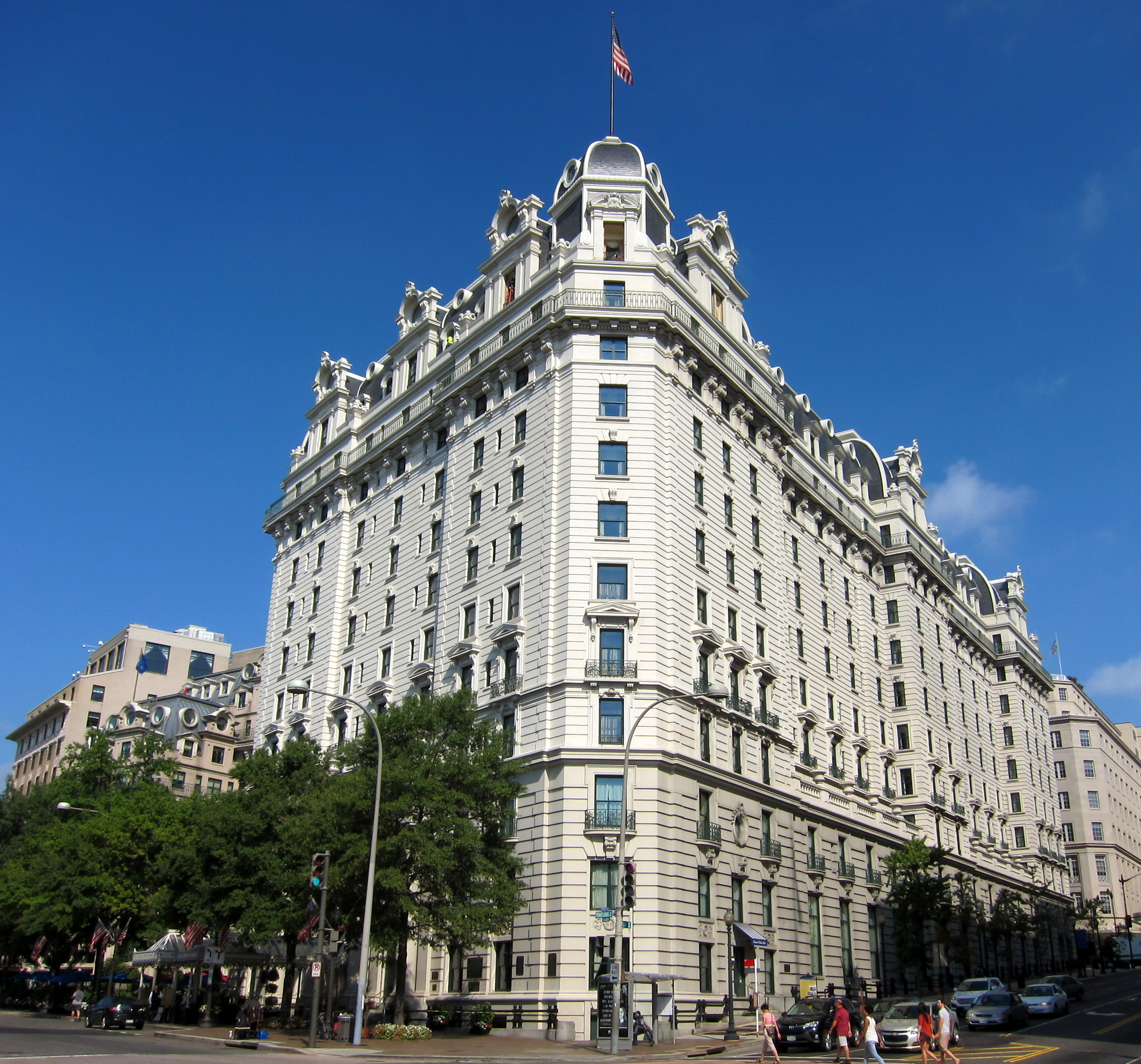
Willard Hotel – Washington D.C.

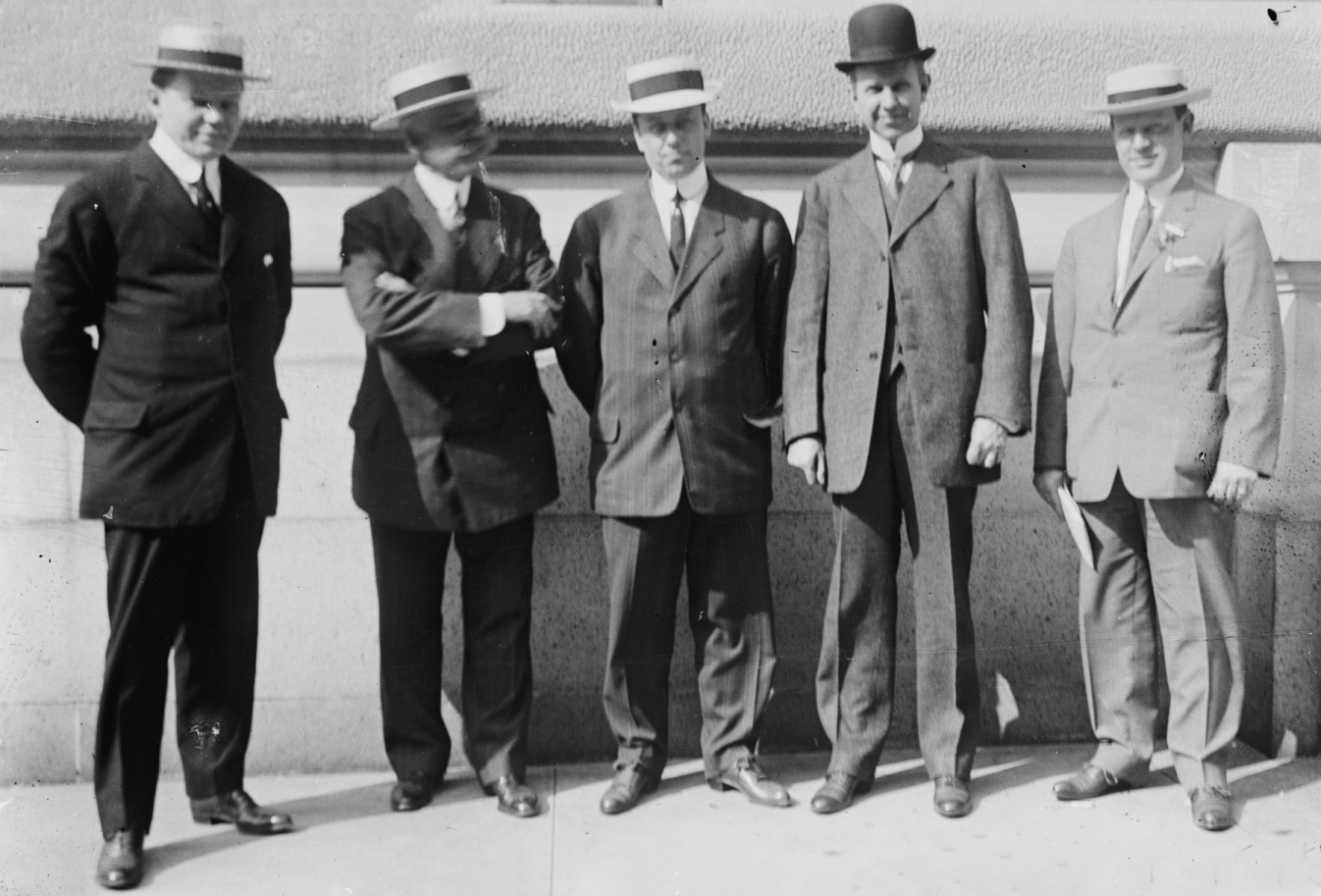
National Electric Light Association members, c. 1912

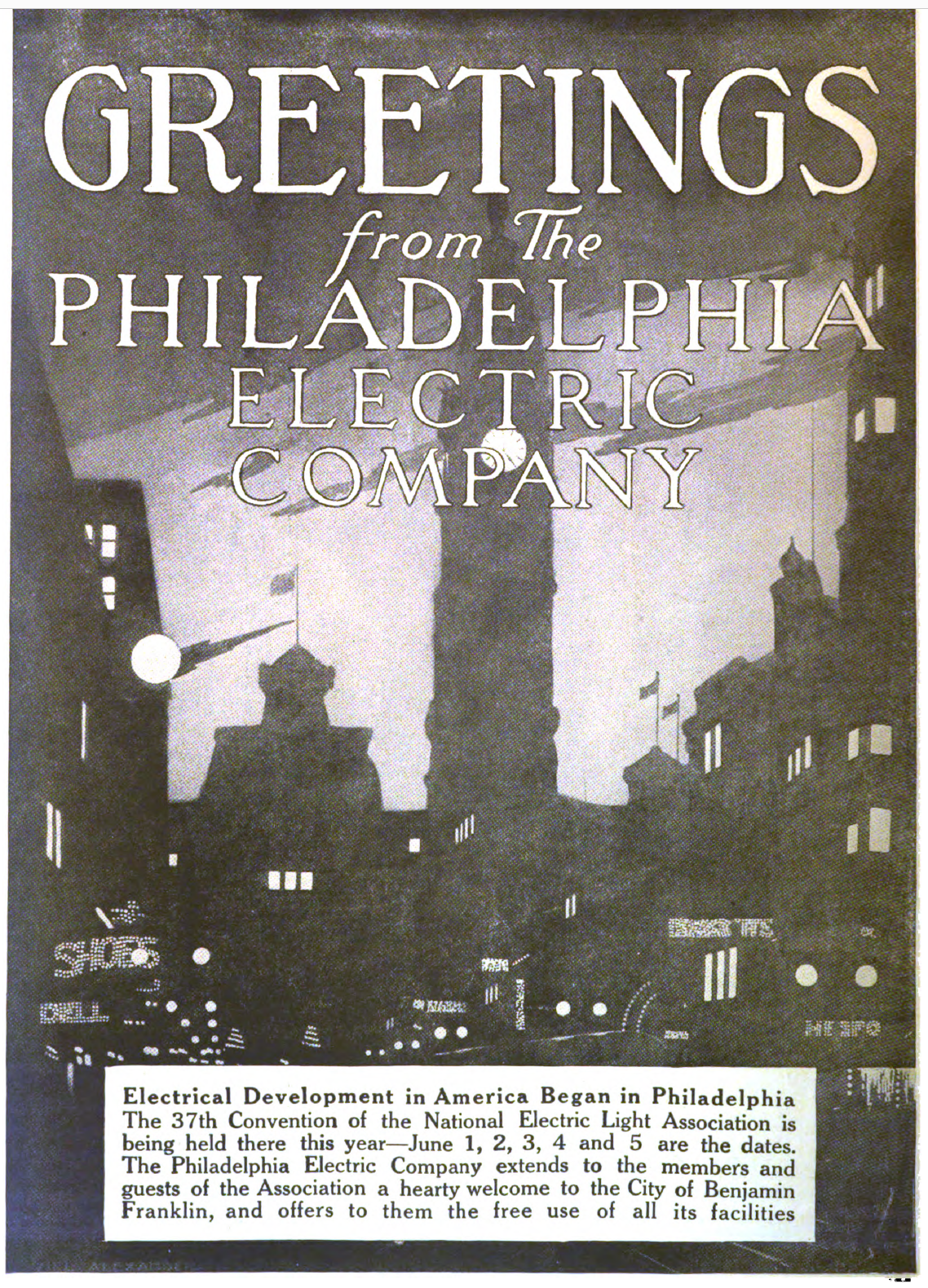
Philadelphia Electric Company welcome ad to NELA May 1914

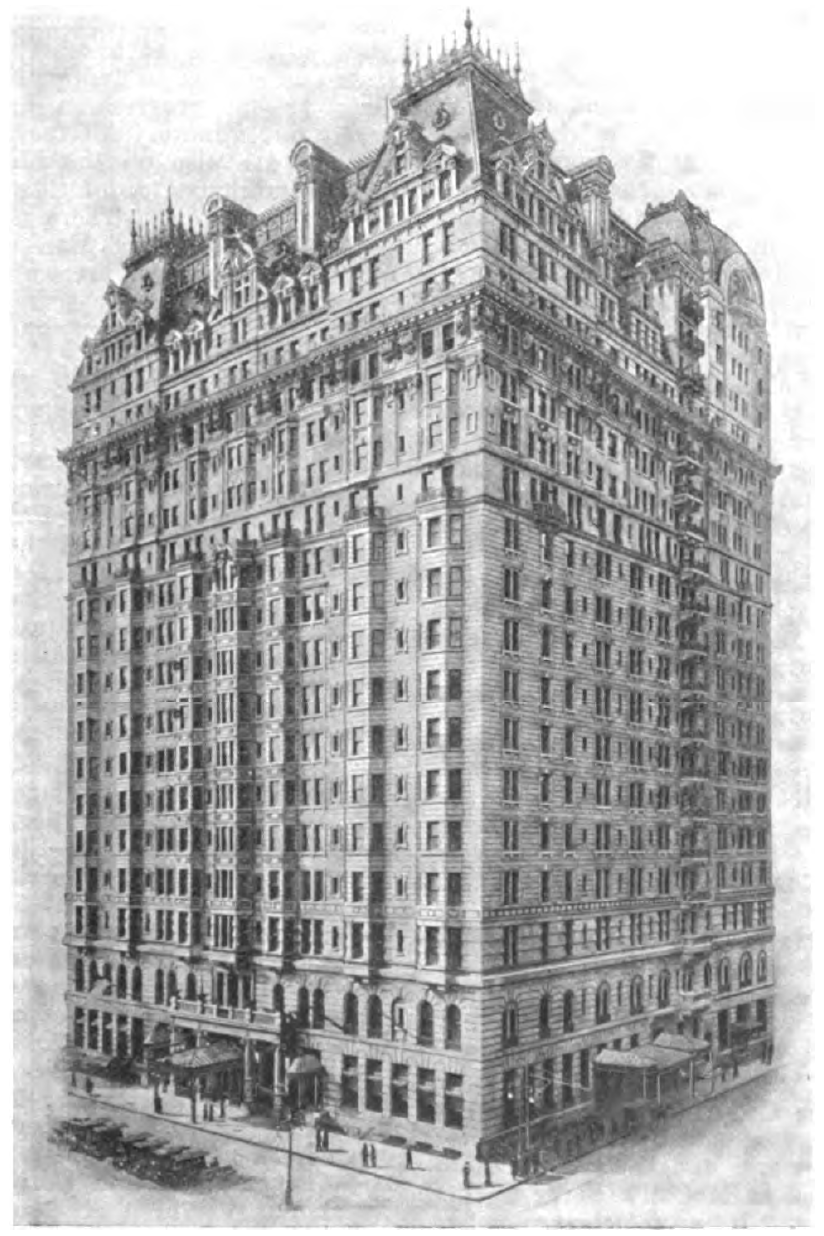
Headquarters for the NELA Convention, the Bellvue-Stratford Hotel in Phialdelpha PA c. 1914

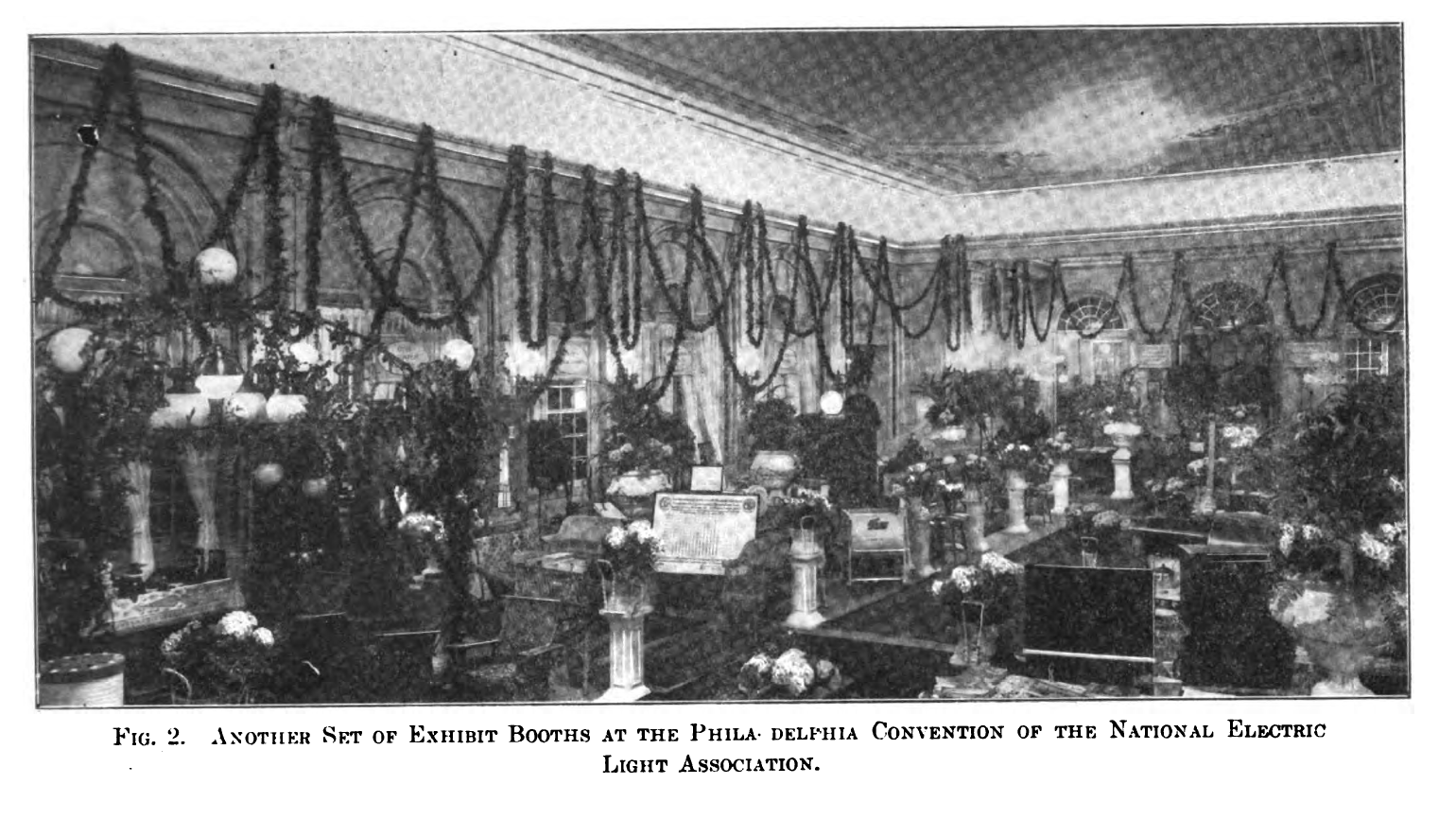
NELA Convention Philadelphia PA Exhibition Hall c. 1914

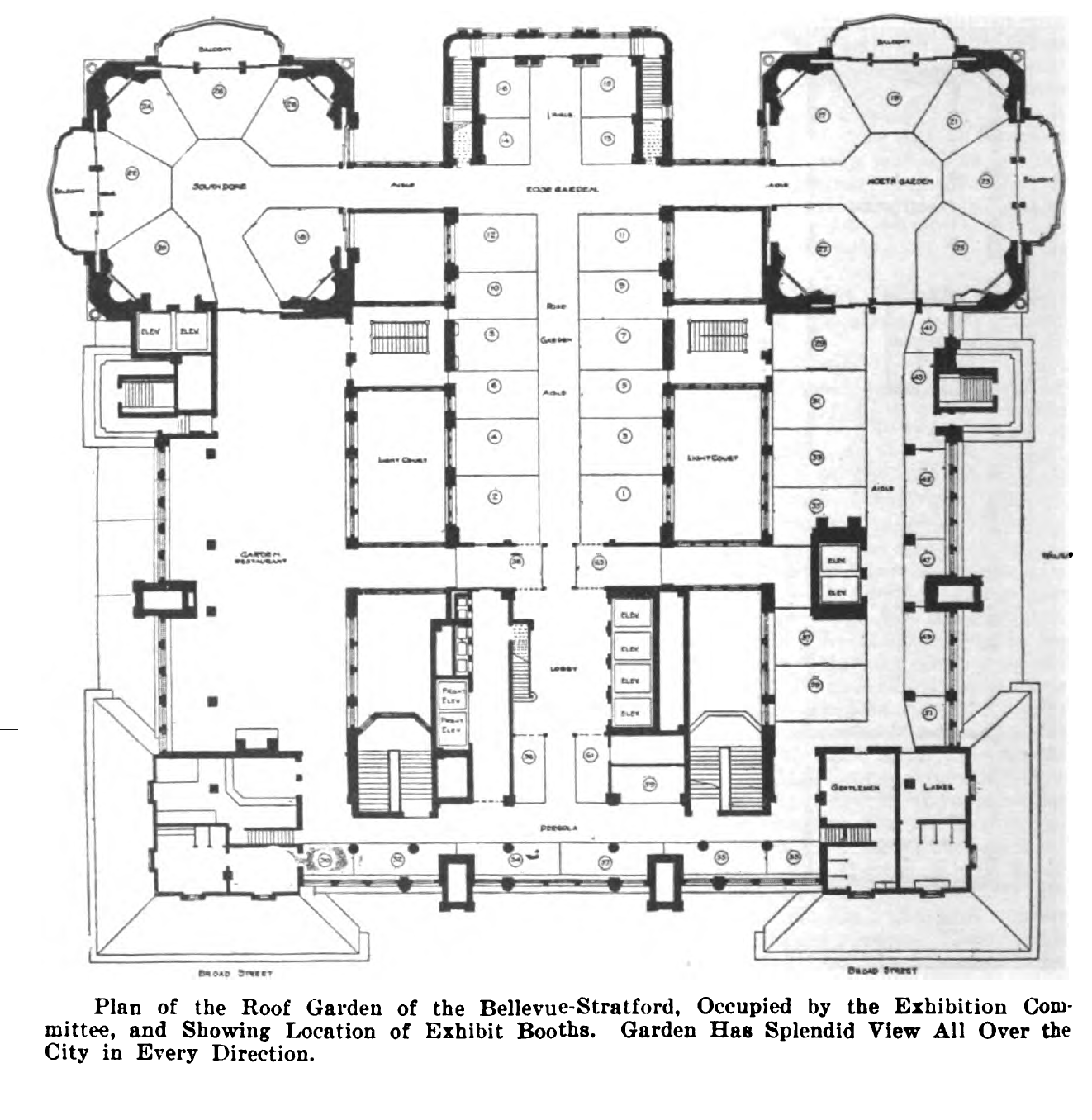
NELA Convention Floor-plan at the Bellvue-Stratford Hotel c. 1914

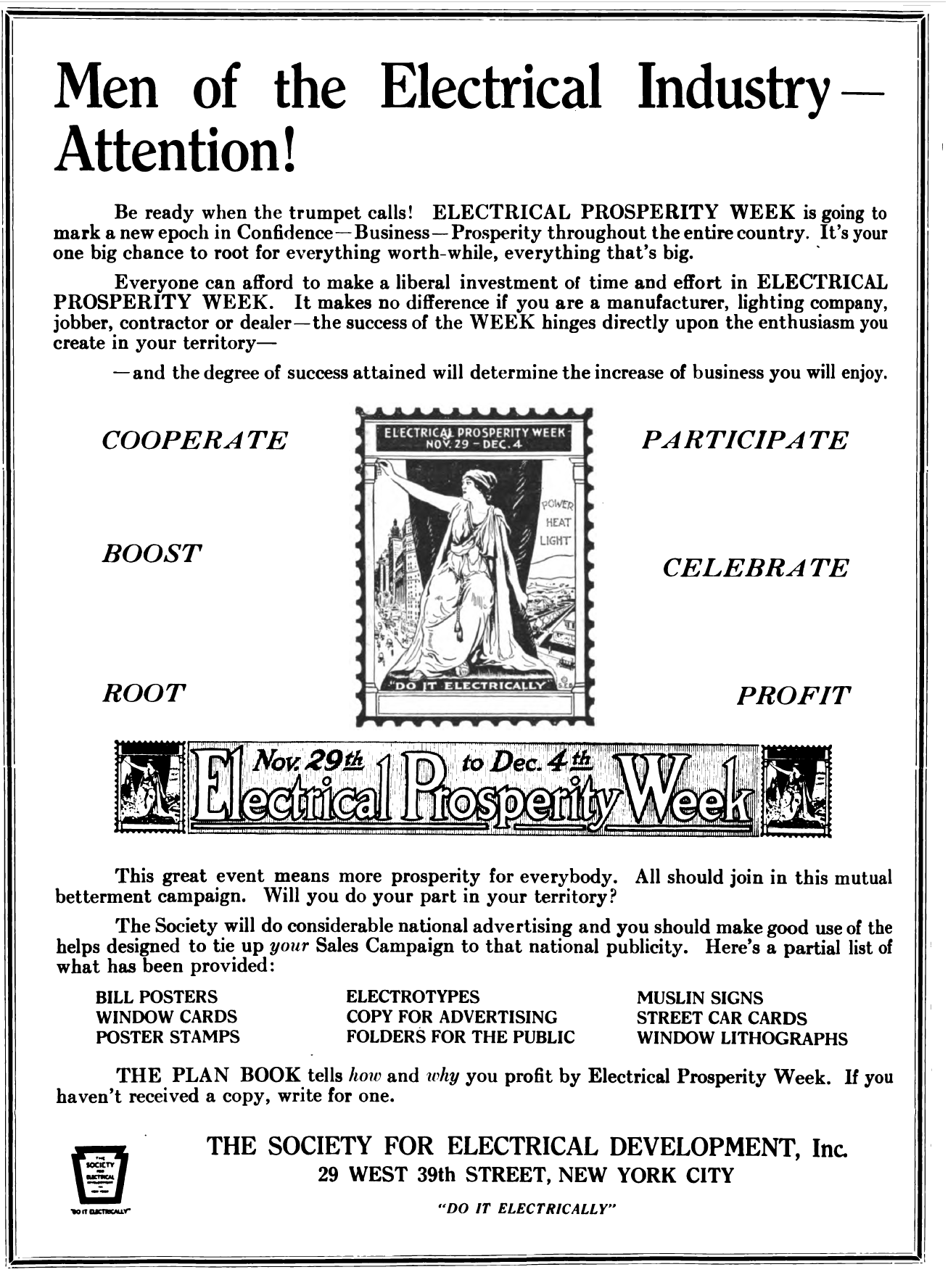
Electrical Society for Electrical Development's Electrical Prosperity Week nationwide campaign Advertisement 1914

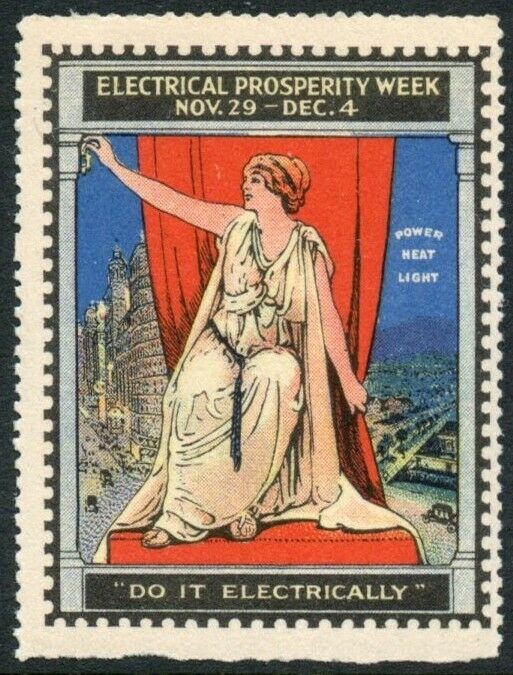
Society for Electrical Development Inc. stamp for Electrical Prosperity Week, November 29 to December 4, 1914

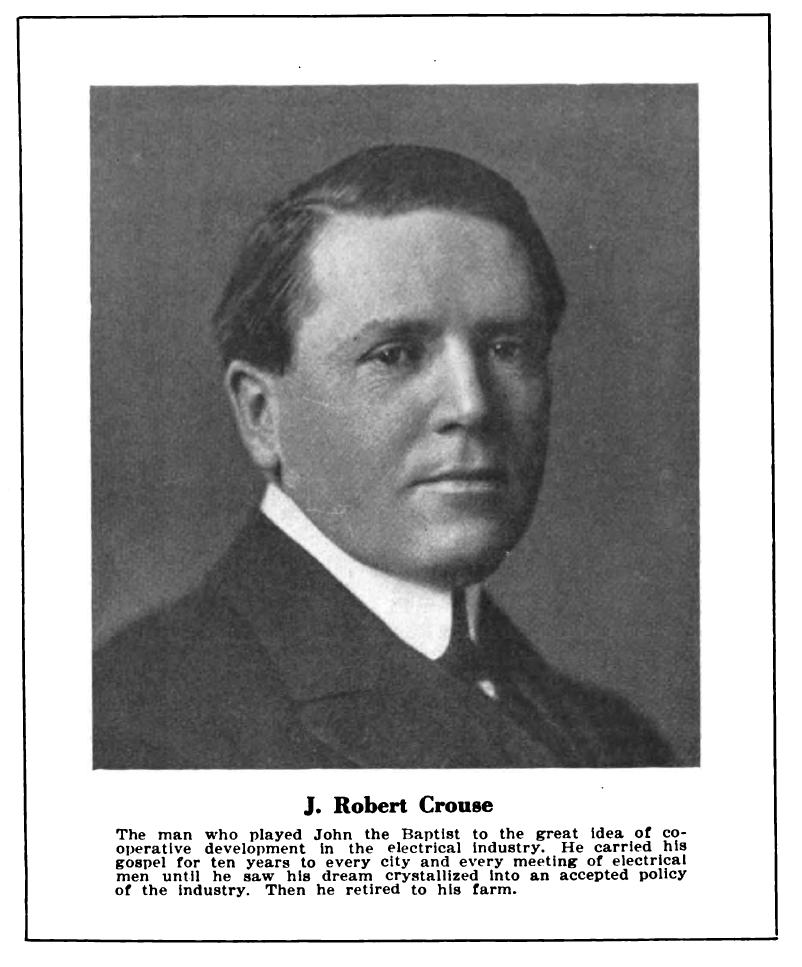
J. Robert Crouse

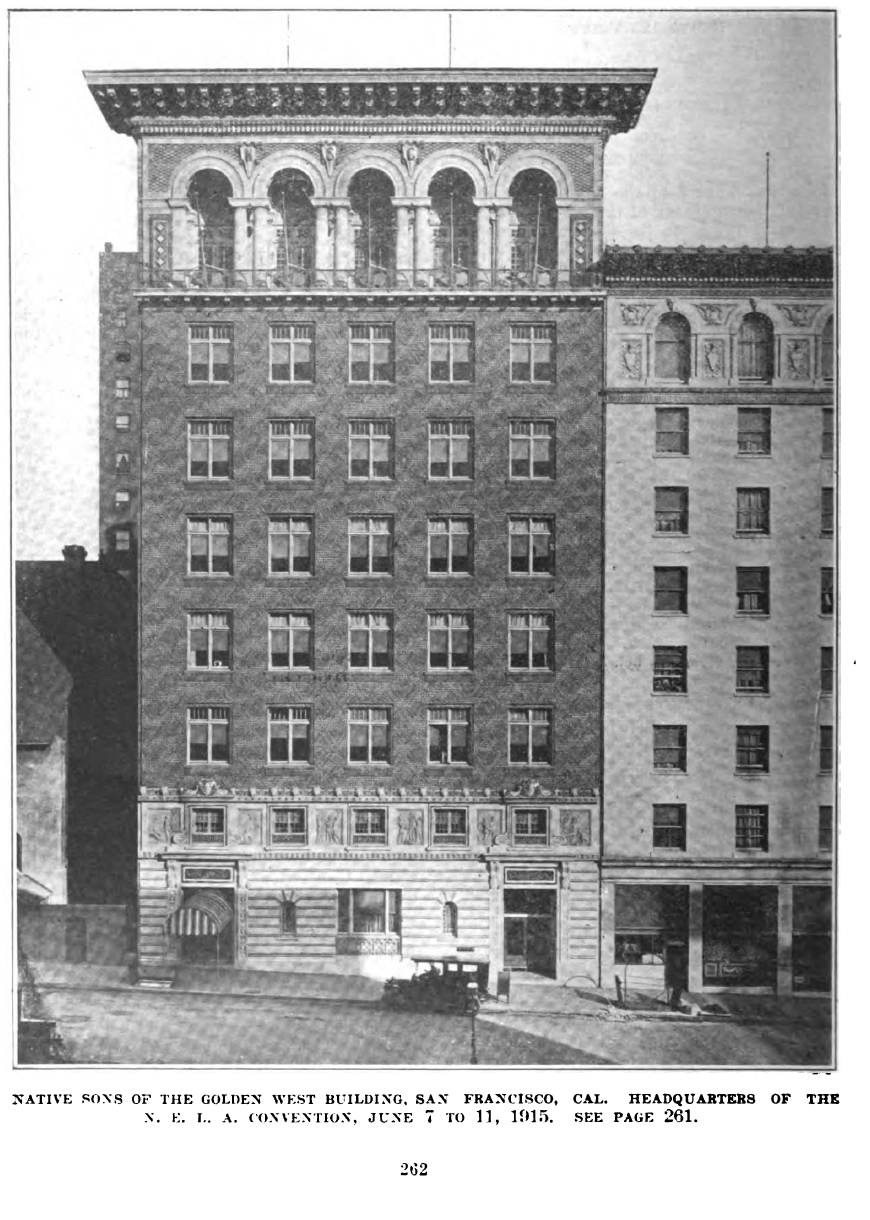
San Francisco NELA convention headquarters c. 1915

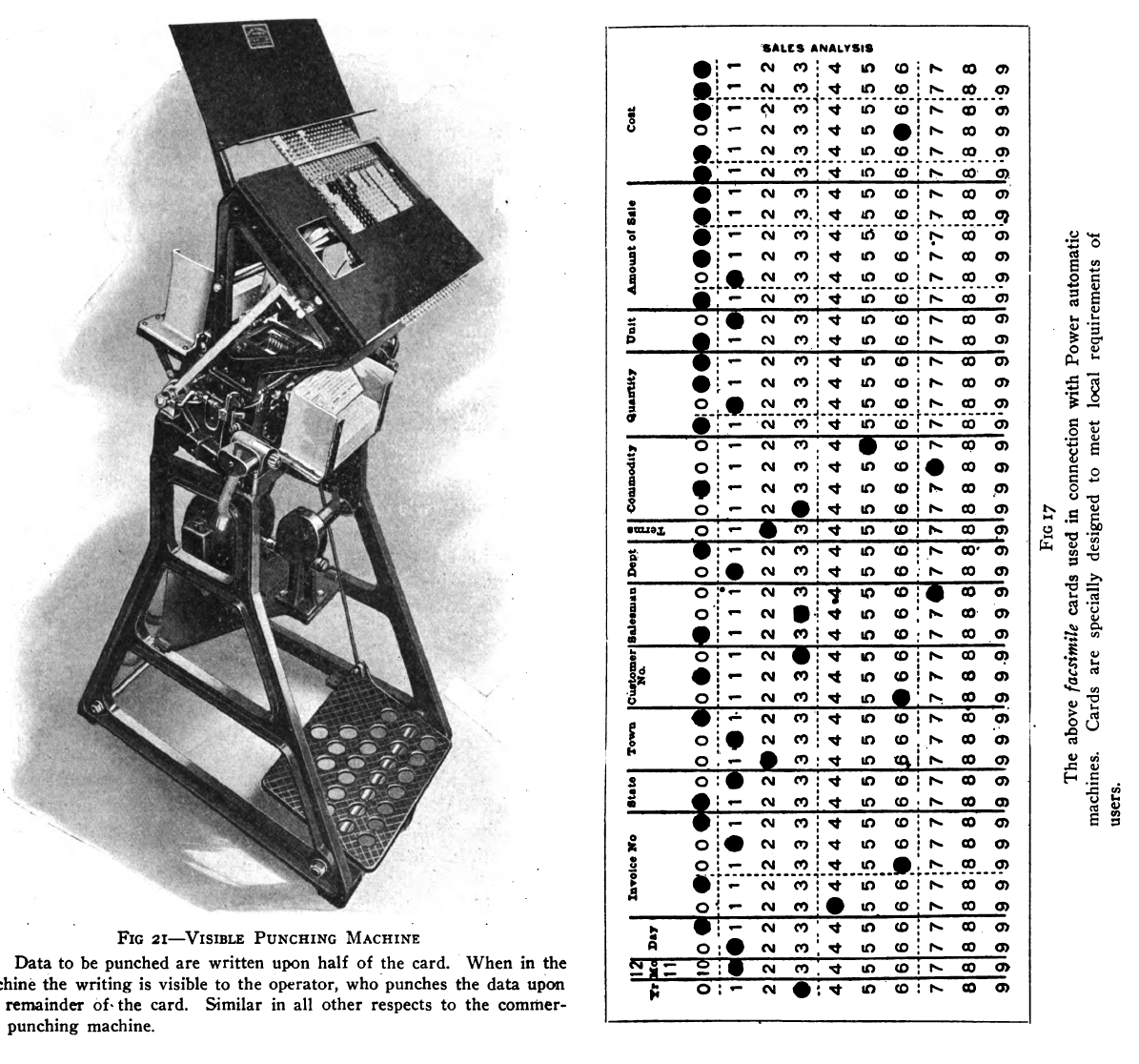
Annual NELA Report documenting use of punch cards 1915

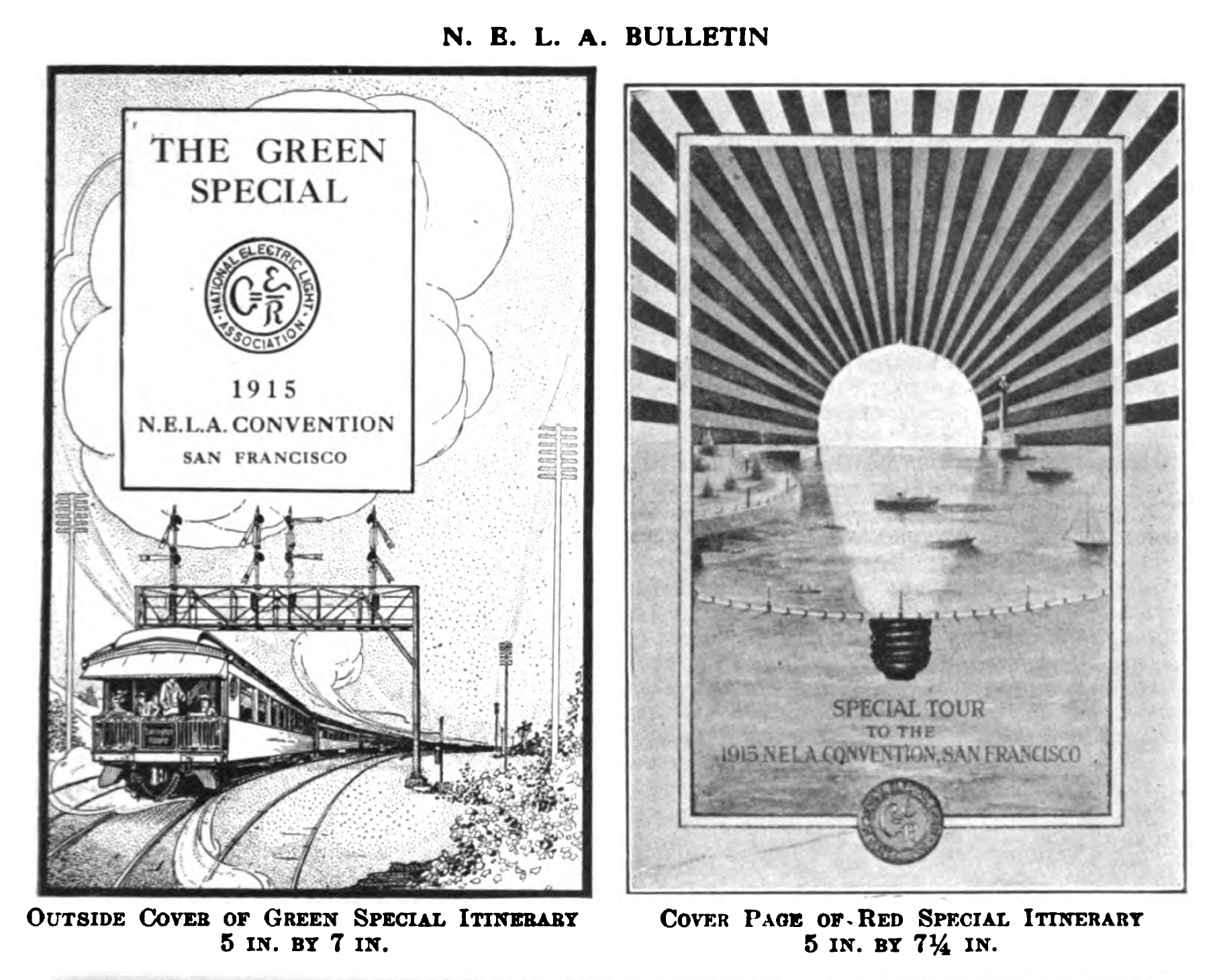
NELA San Francisco convention guide and brochure c. 1915

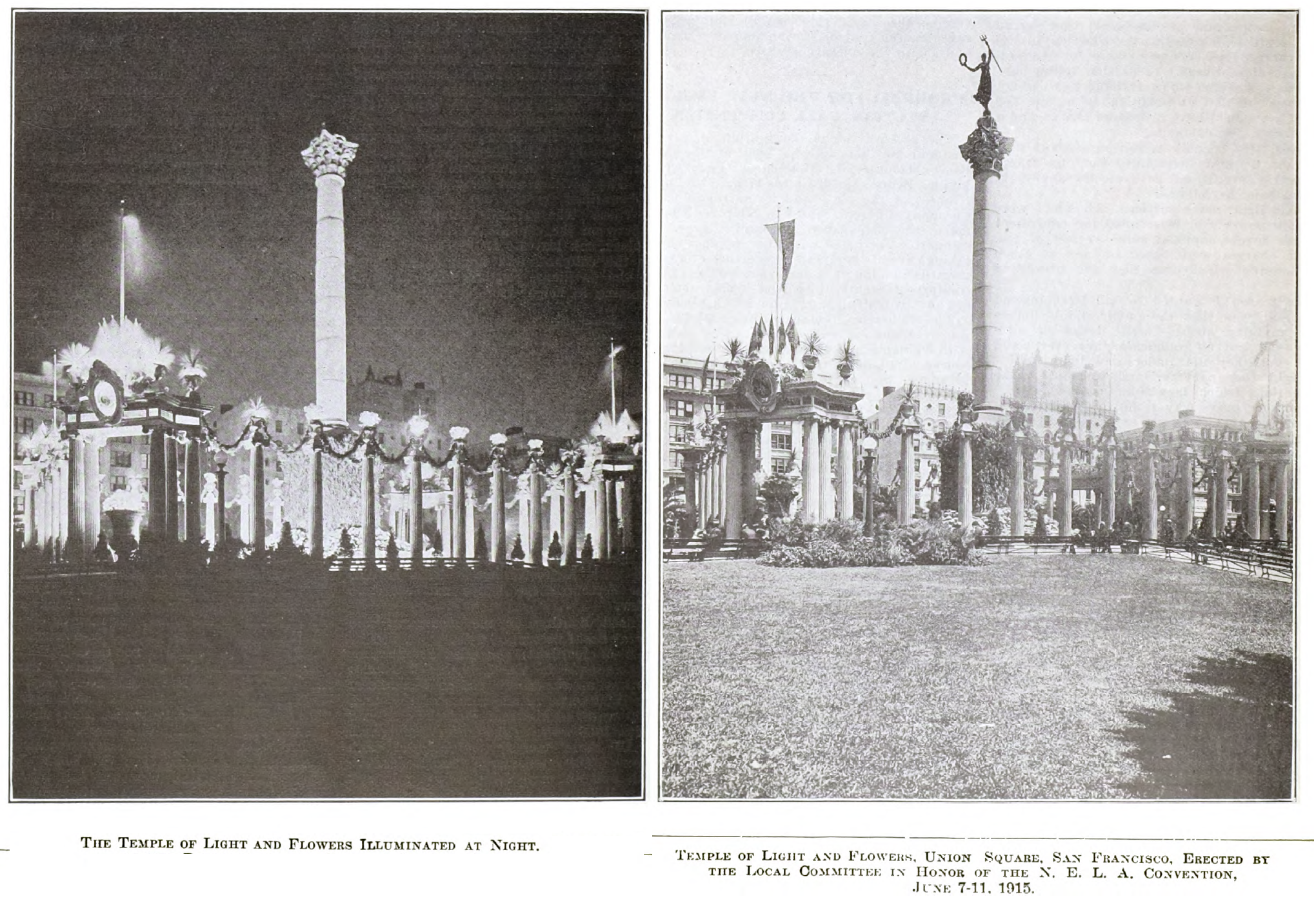
NELA San Francisco Convention Electric Temple c. 1915

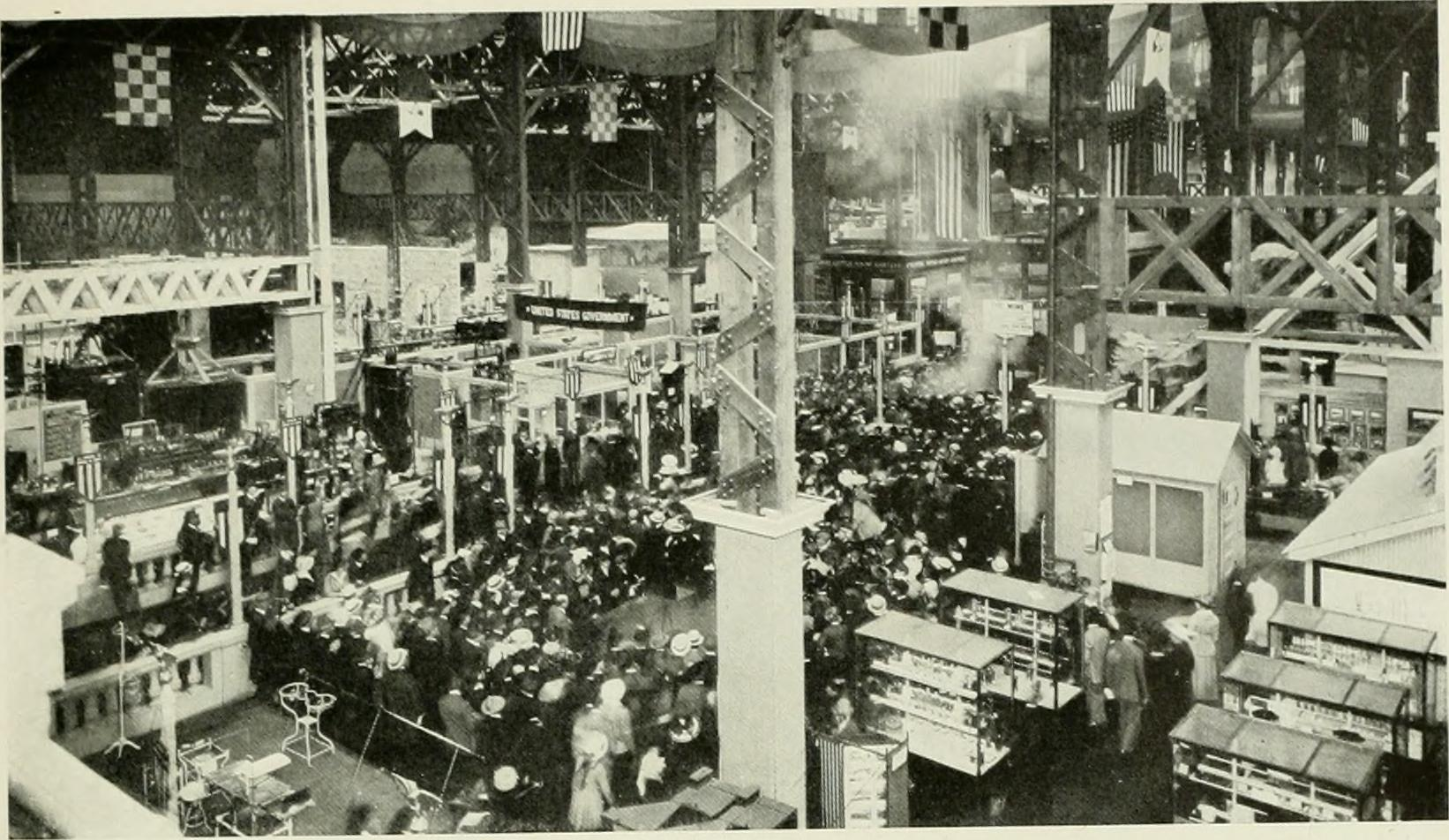
Panama Pacific International Exposition Machinery Hall 1915

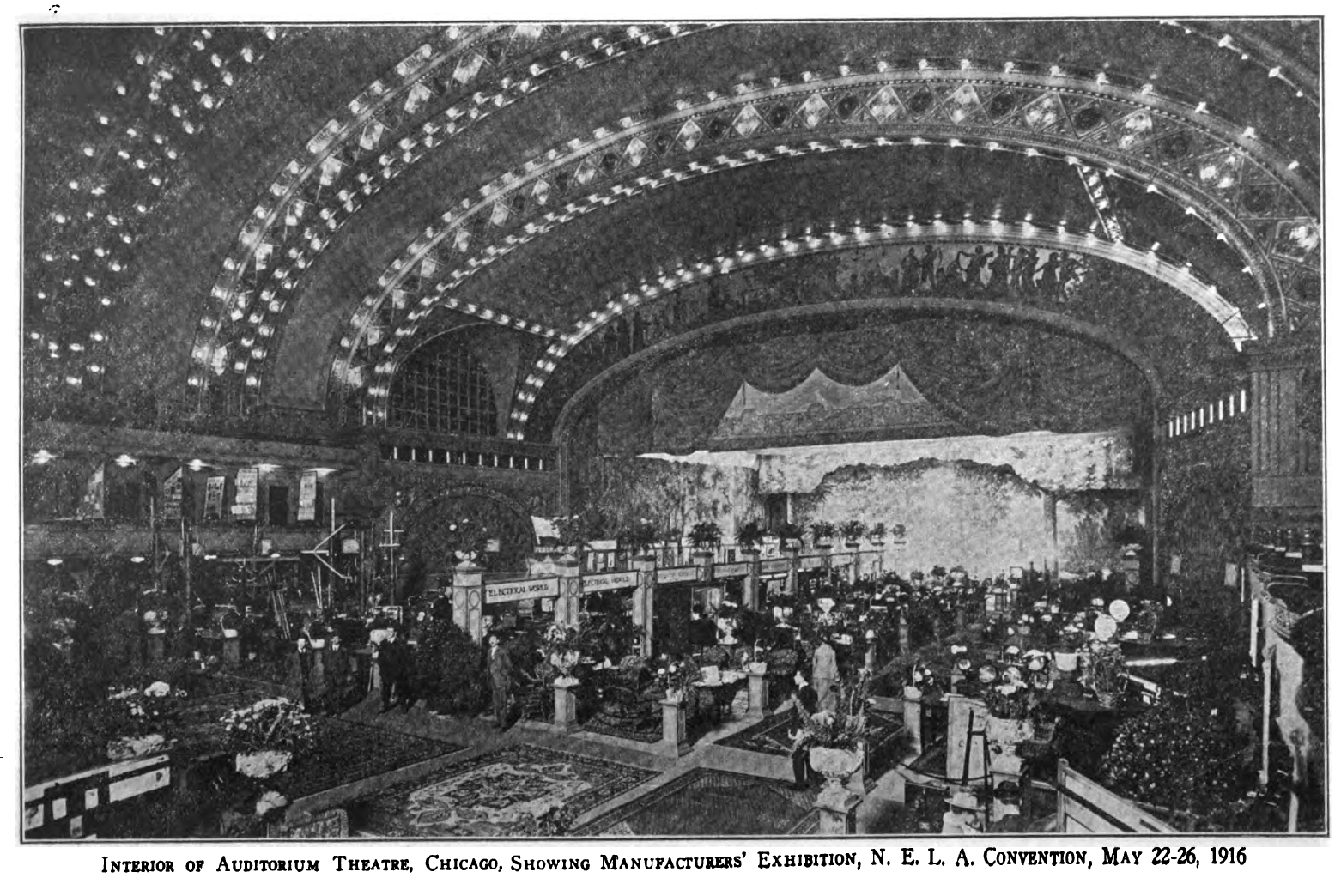
NELA's Exhibition Hall in Chicago c. 1916

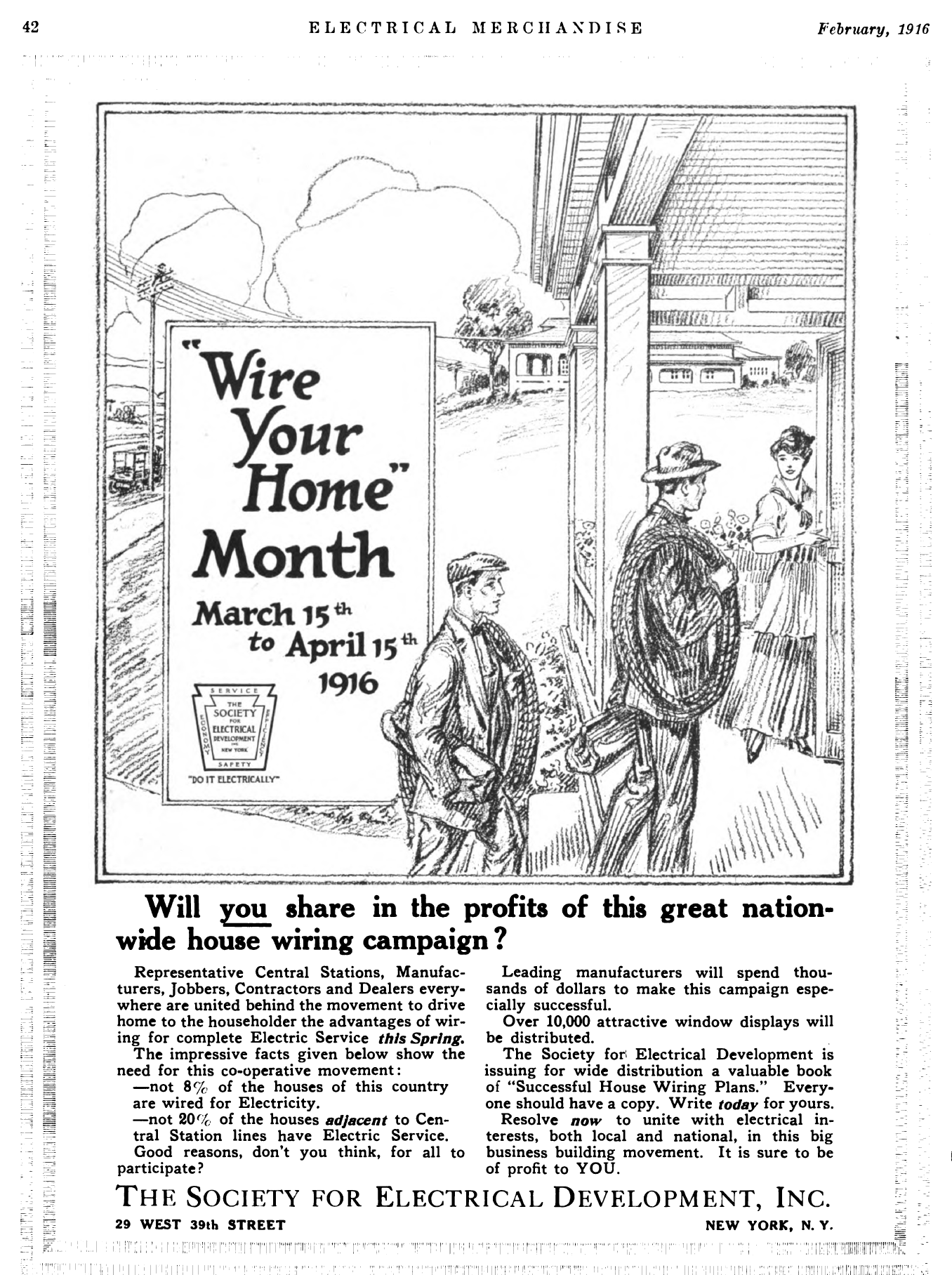
Society for Electrical Development Wire your Home month advertisement in Electrical Merchandising 1916

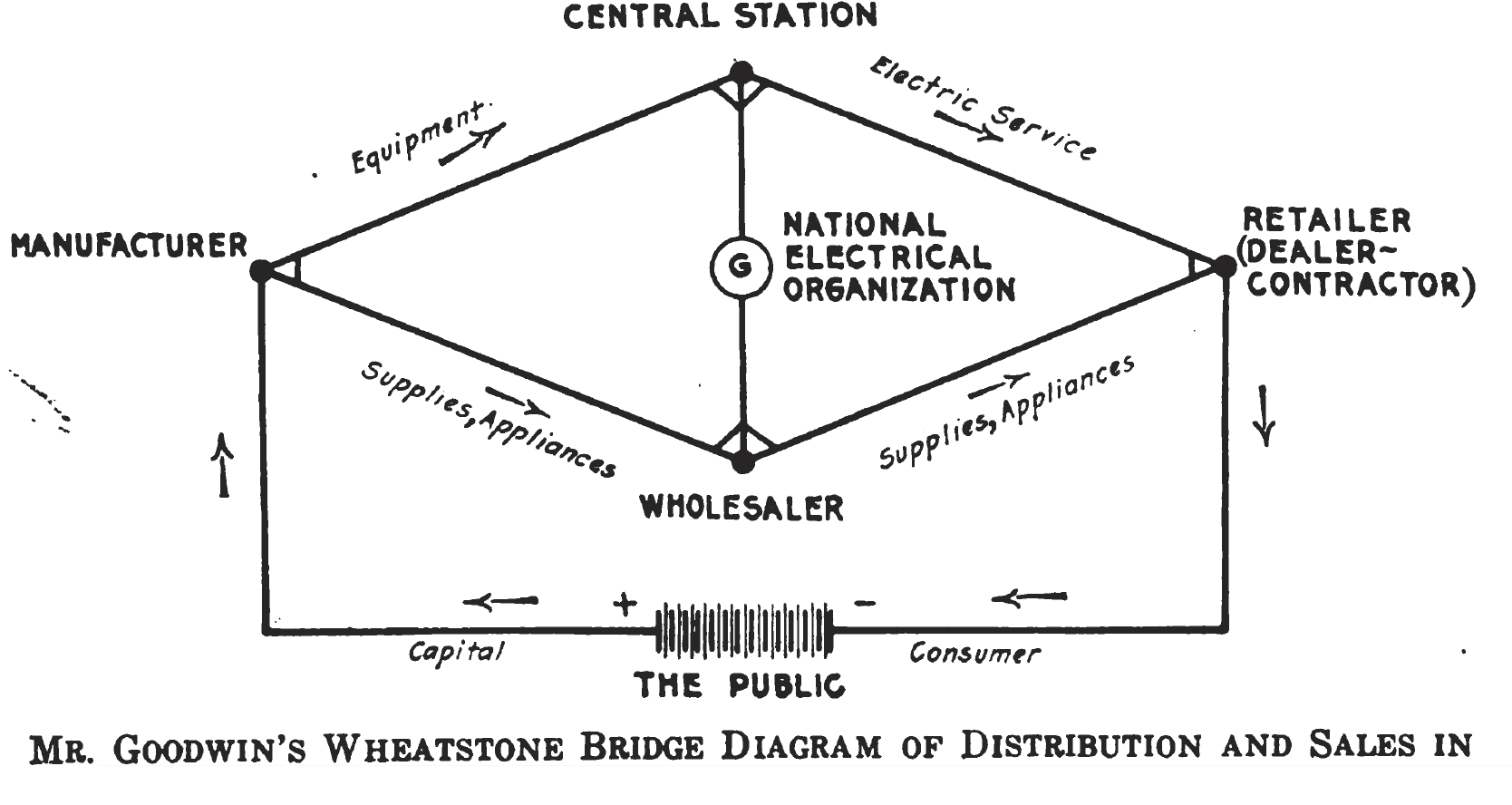
W.L. Goodwin's Wheatstone Bridge model for electric appliance sales – 1917

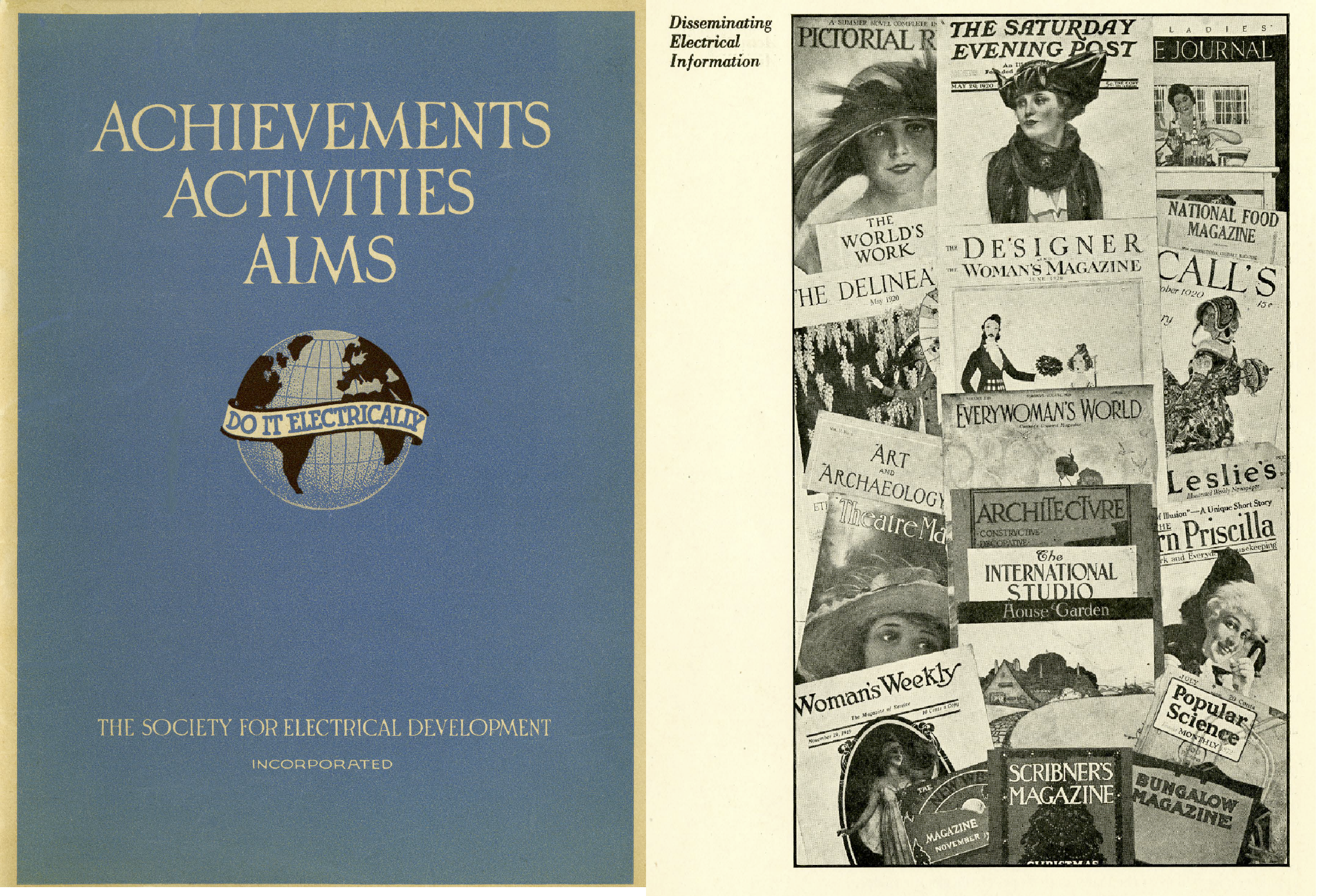
Book: Society for Electrical Development Inc. Achievements – Activities – Aims

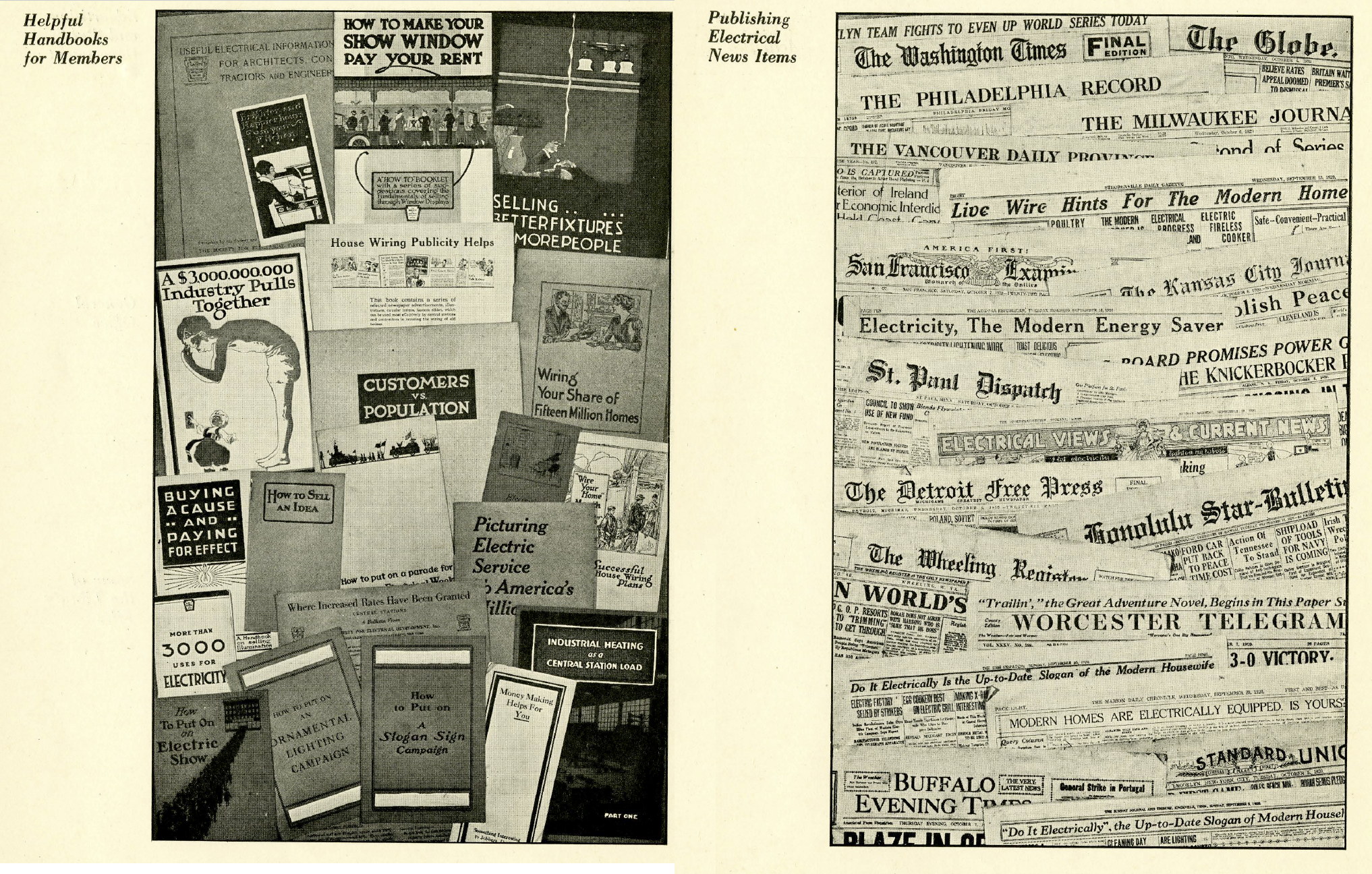
Society for Electrical Development Inc. Achievements – Activities – Aims & Outreach mediums

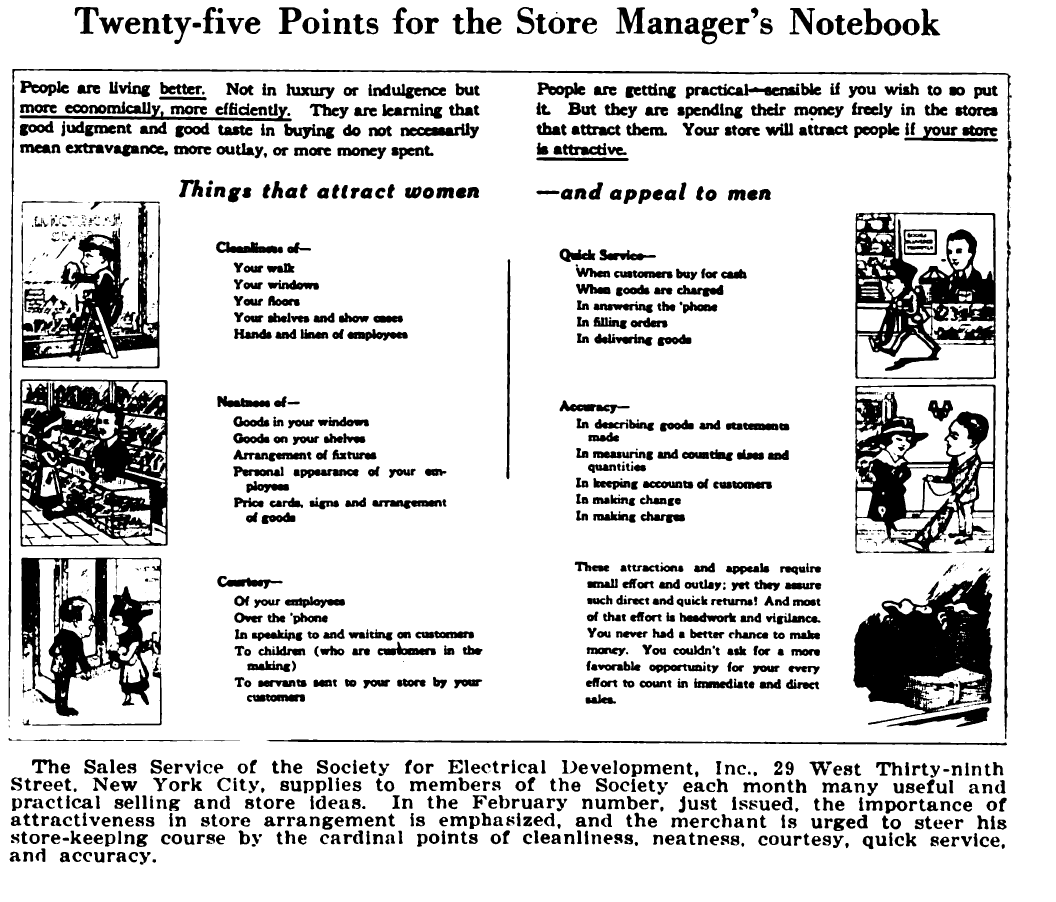
Society for Electrical Development Store Managers sales hints for women and men 1918

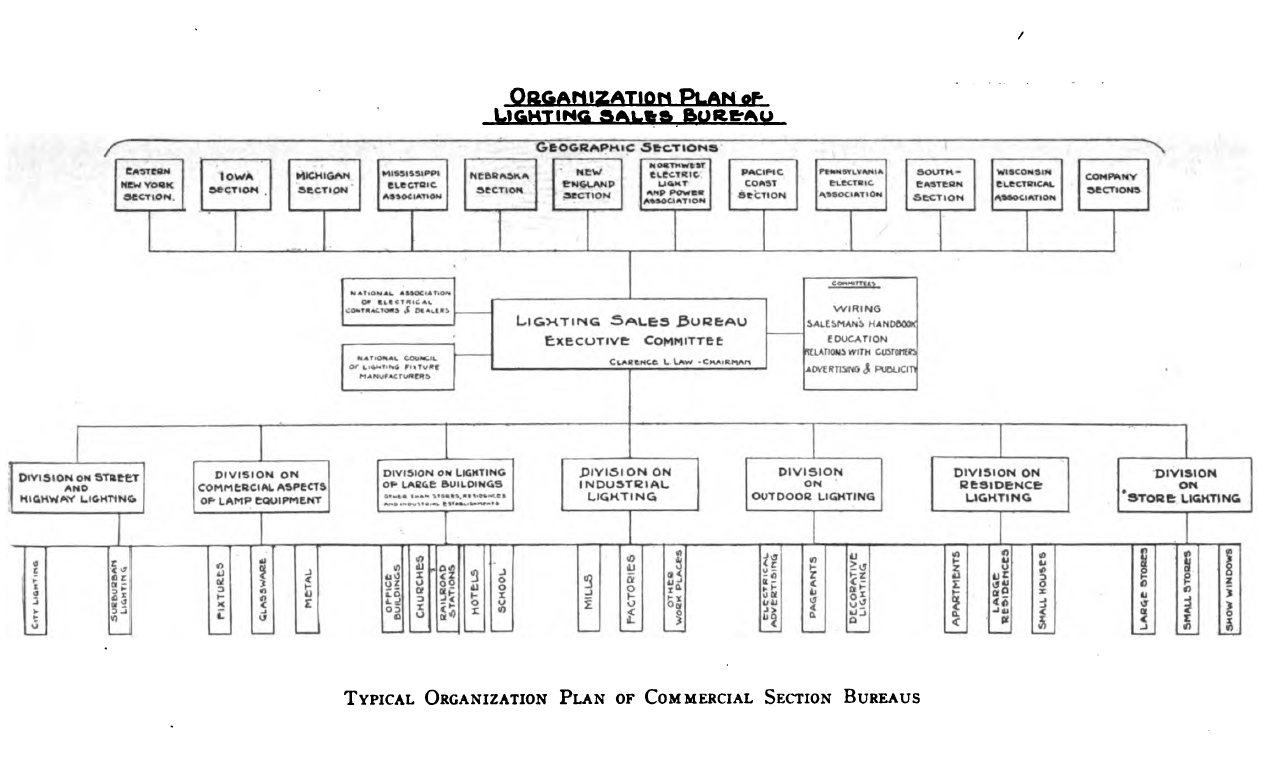
NELA Commercial Lighting Bureau structure c. 1918

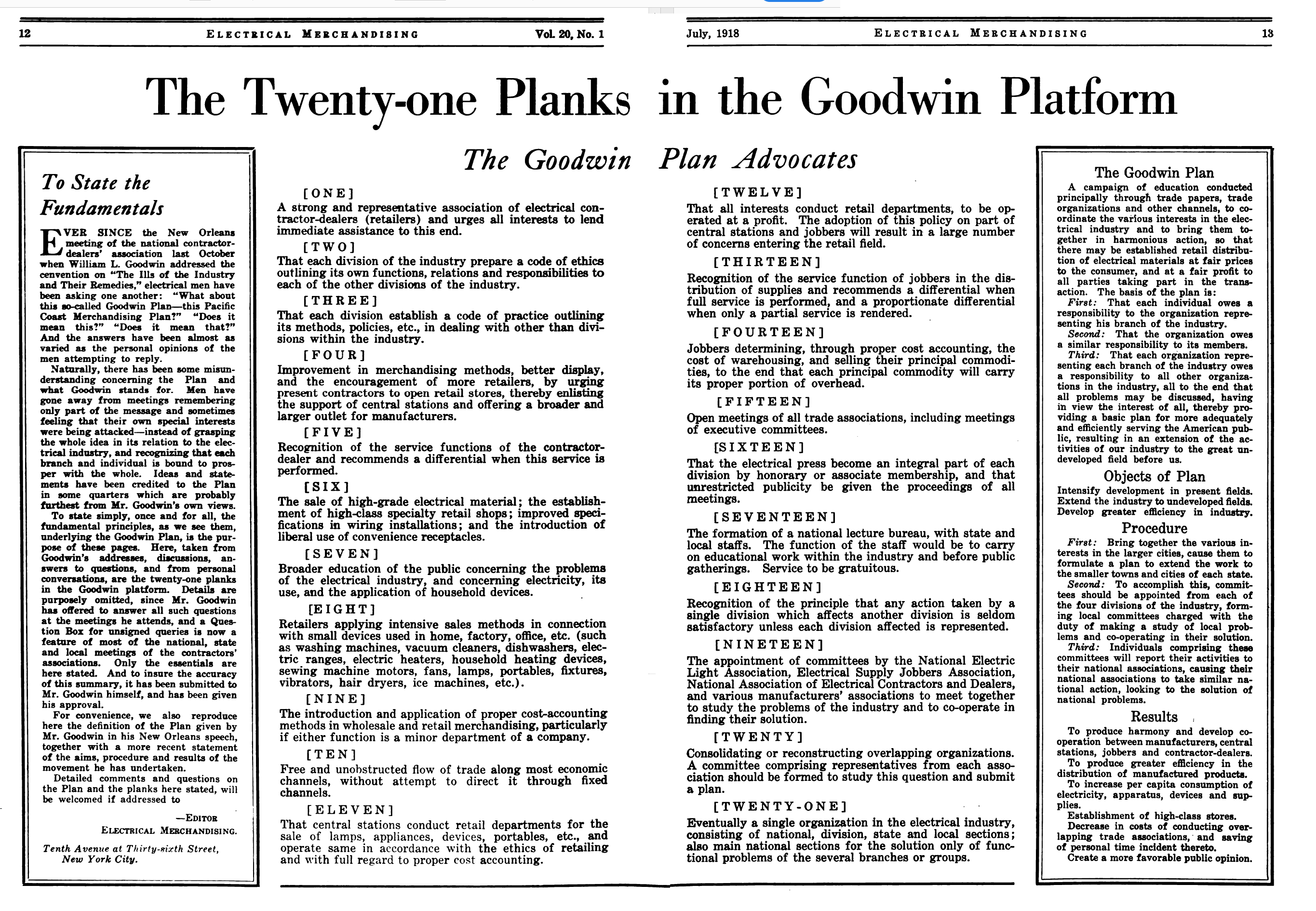
Goodwin Plan Platform July 1918

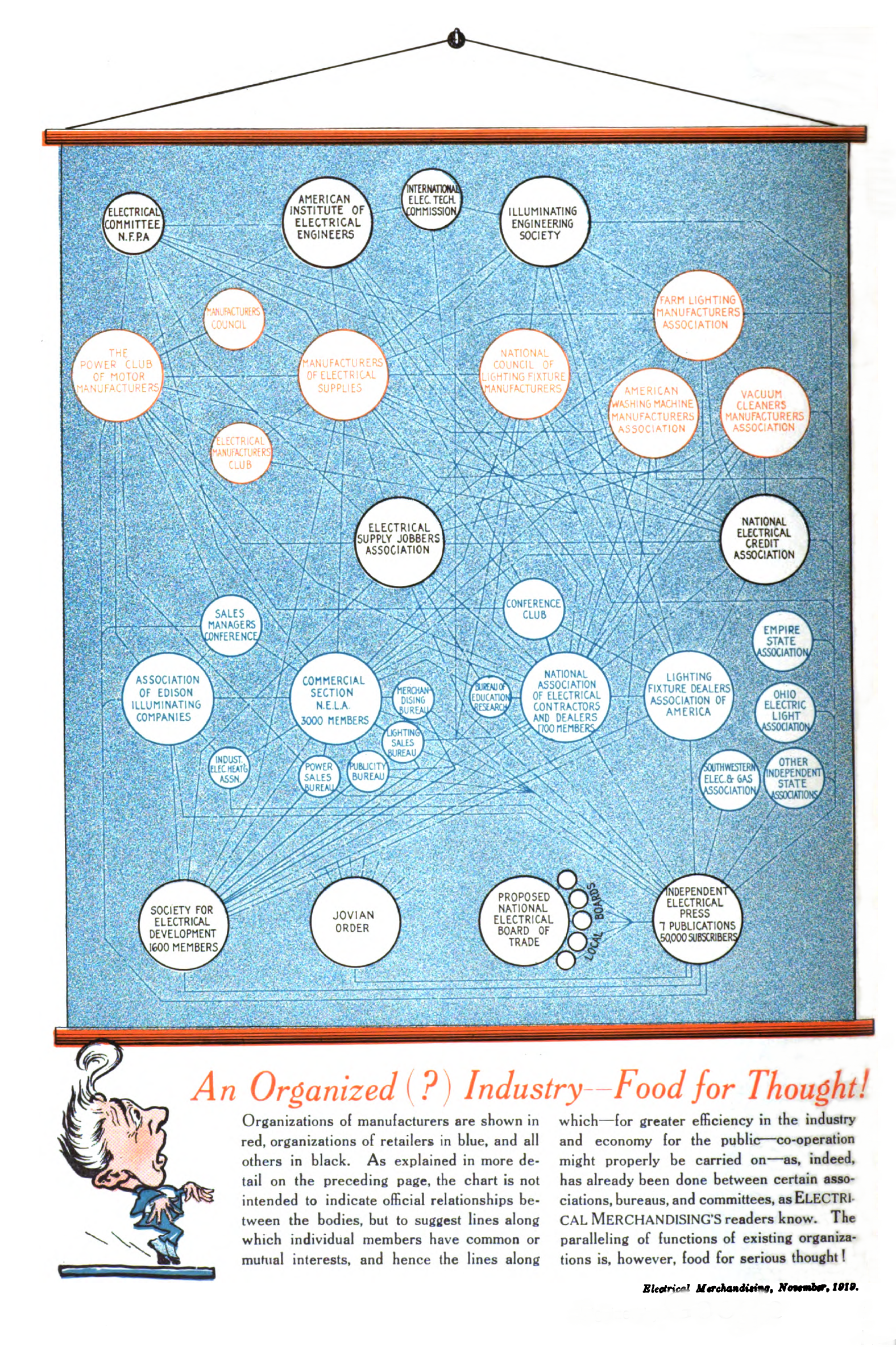
Chart showing Electric Industry Network links 1919

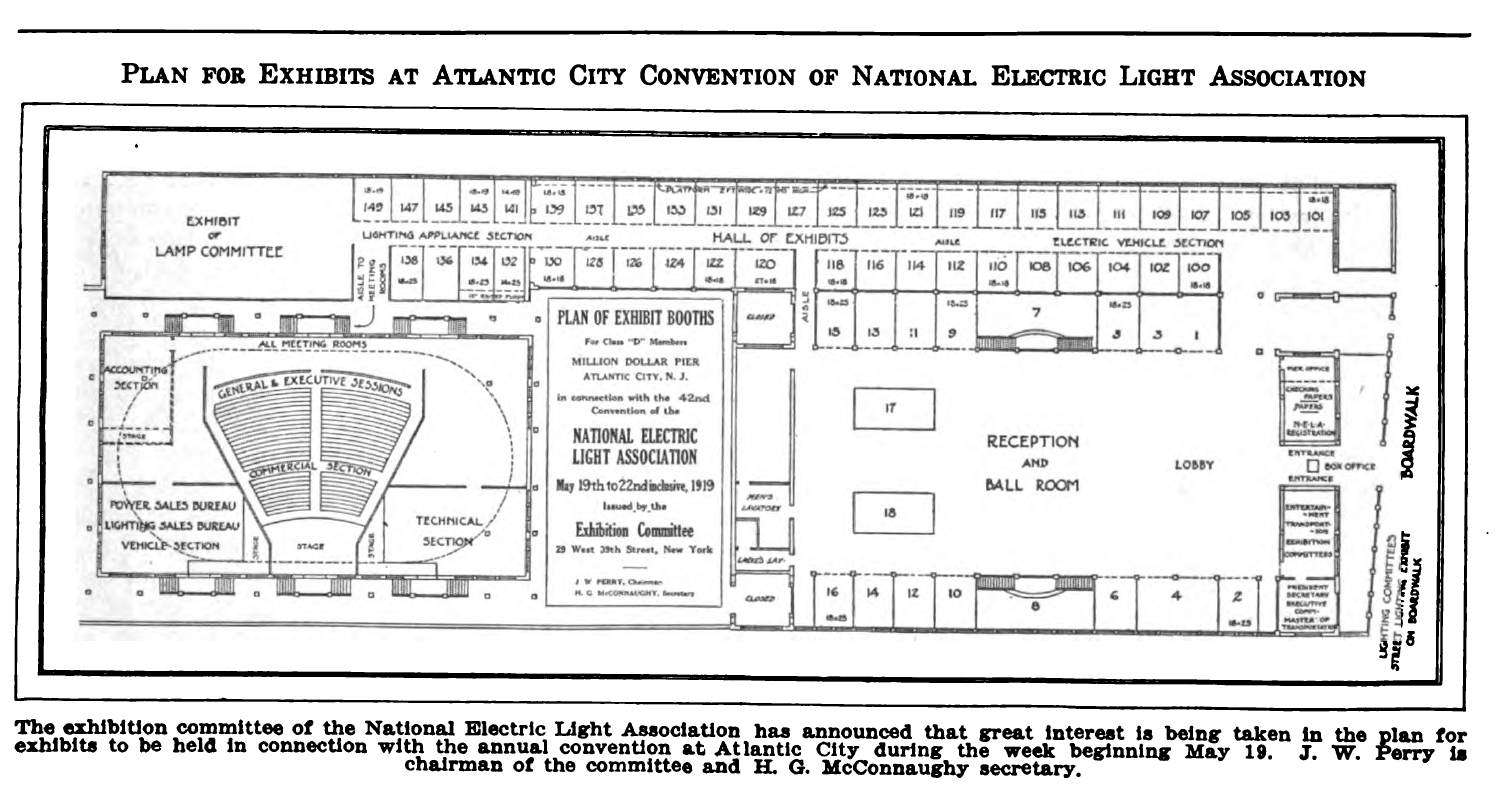
Layout for the 1919 NELA convention exhibition hall in Atlantic City

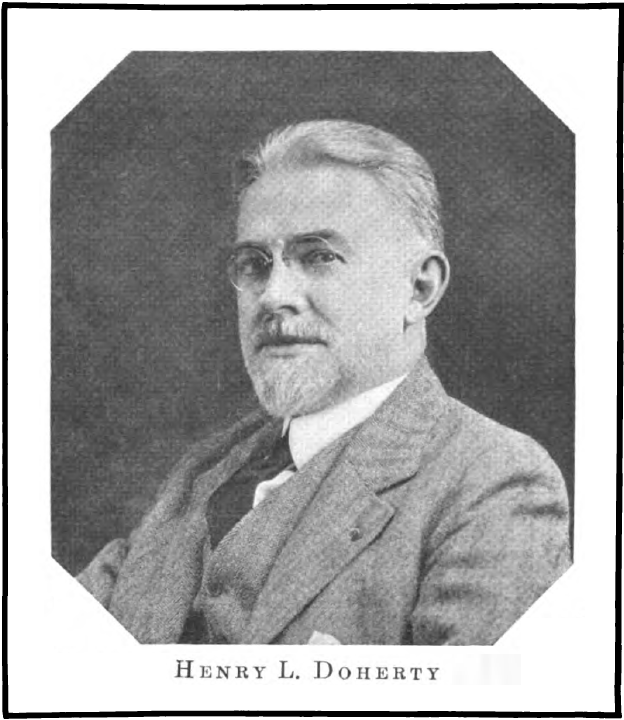
Photo of Henry L. Doherty 1919

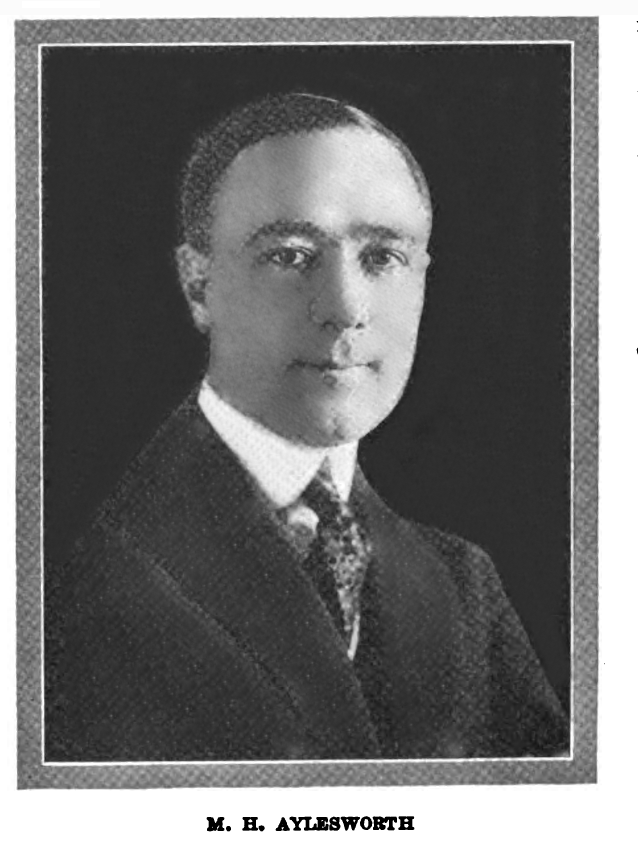
Merlin H. Aylesworth – Executive Director of NELA and first president of NBC 1920

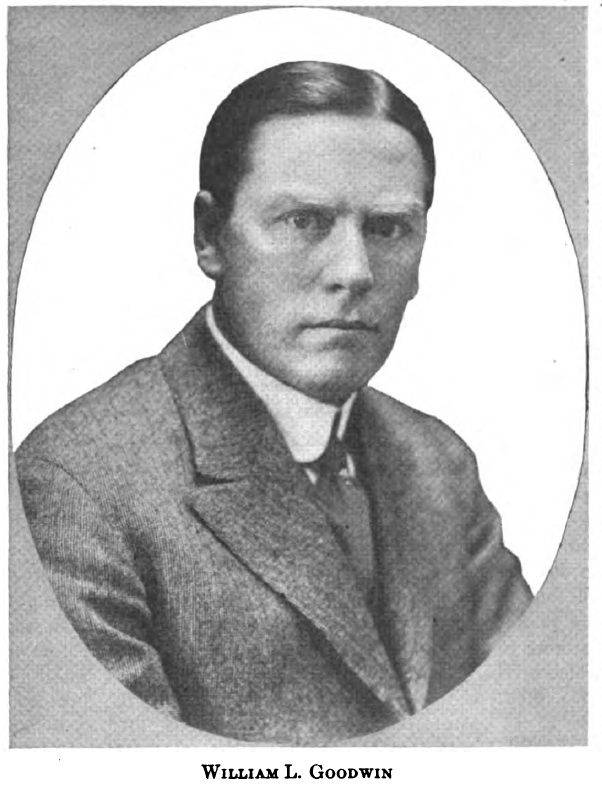
Photo of William L. Goodwin in Electrical Merchandising journal 1920

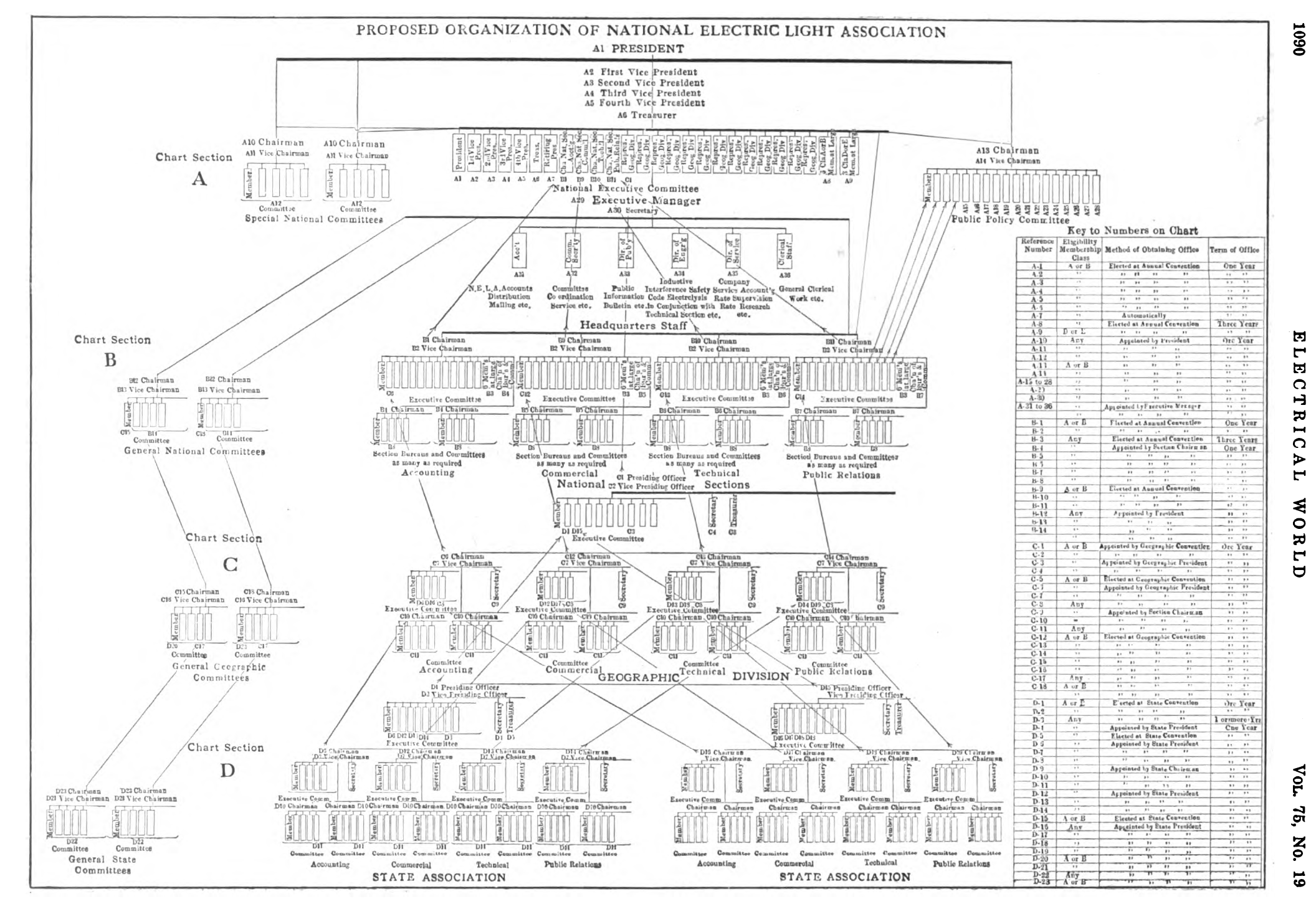
National Electric Light Association Organization Chart – Electrical World 1920

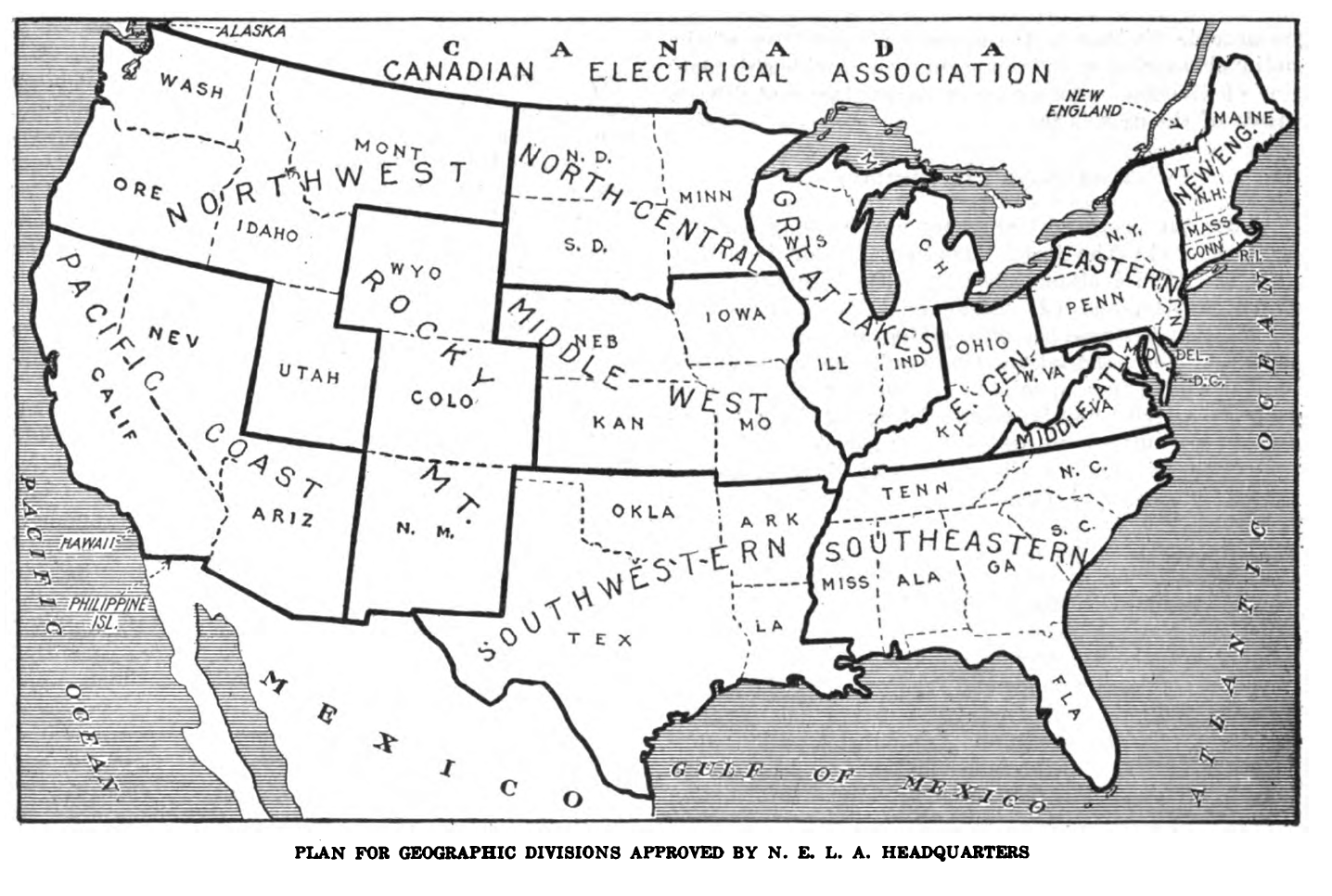
1920 Geographical Divisions of NELA

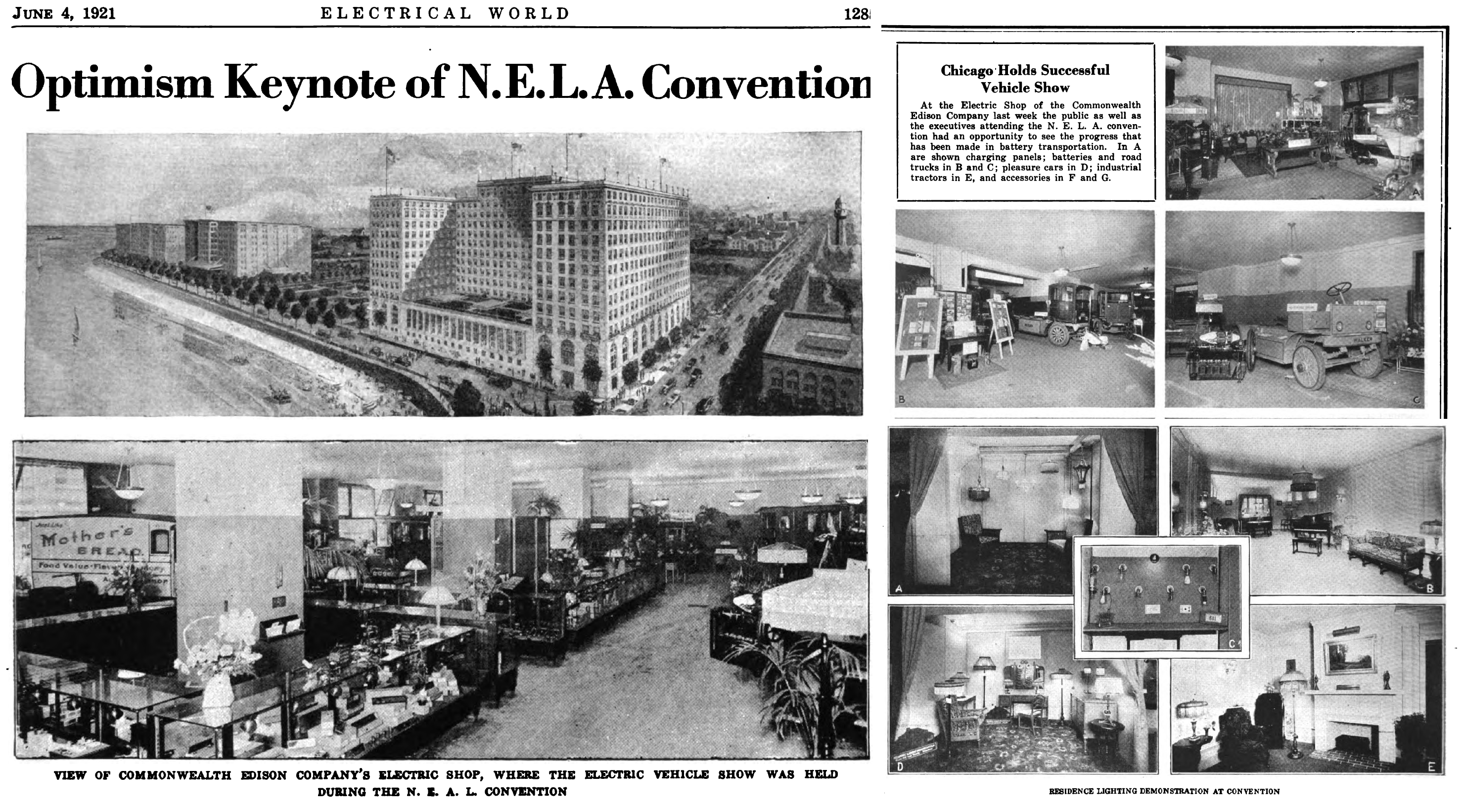
Chicago NELA Convention Collage c. 1921

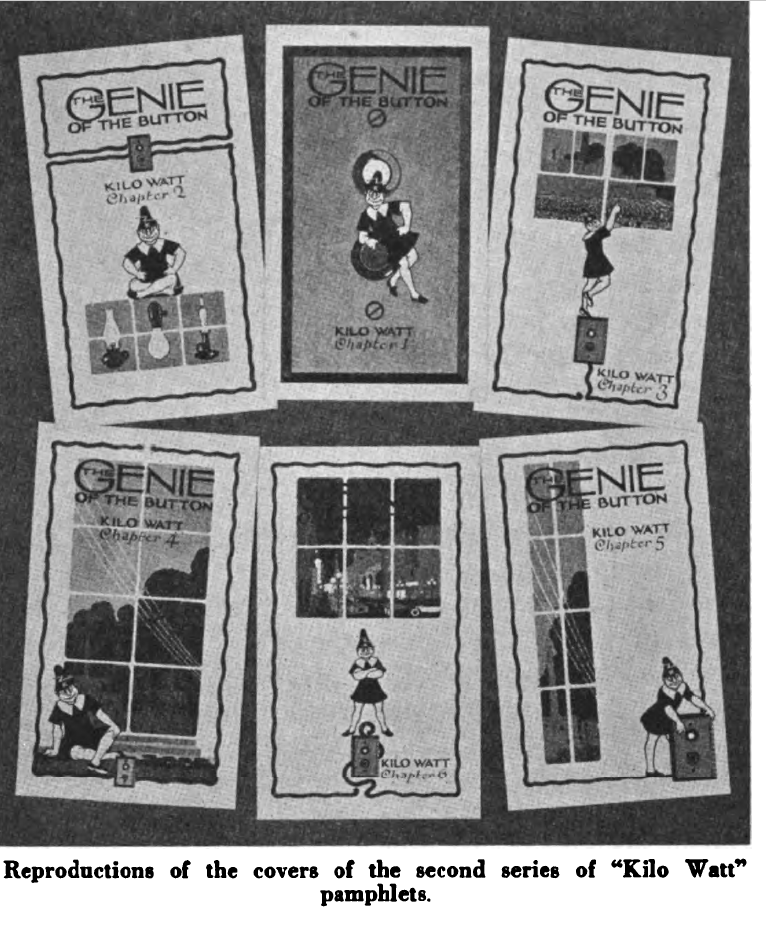
NELA – 6 Part promotional Kilo-Watt booklets 1921

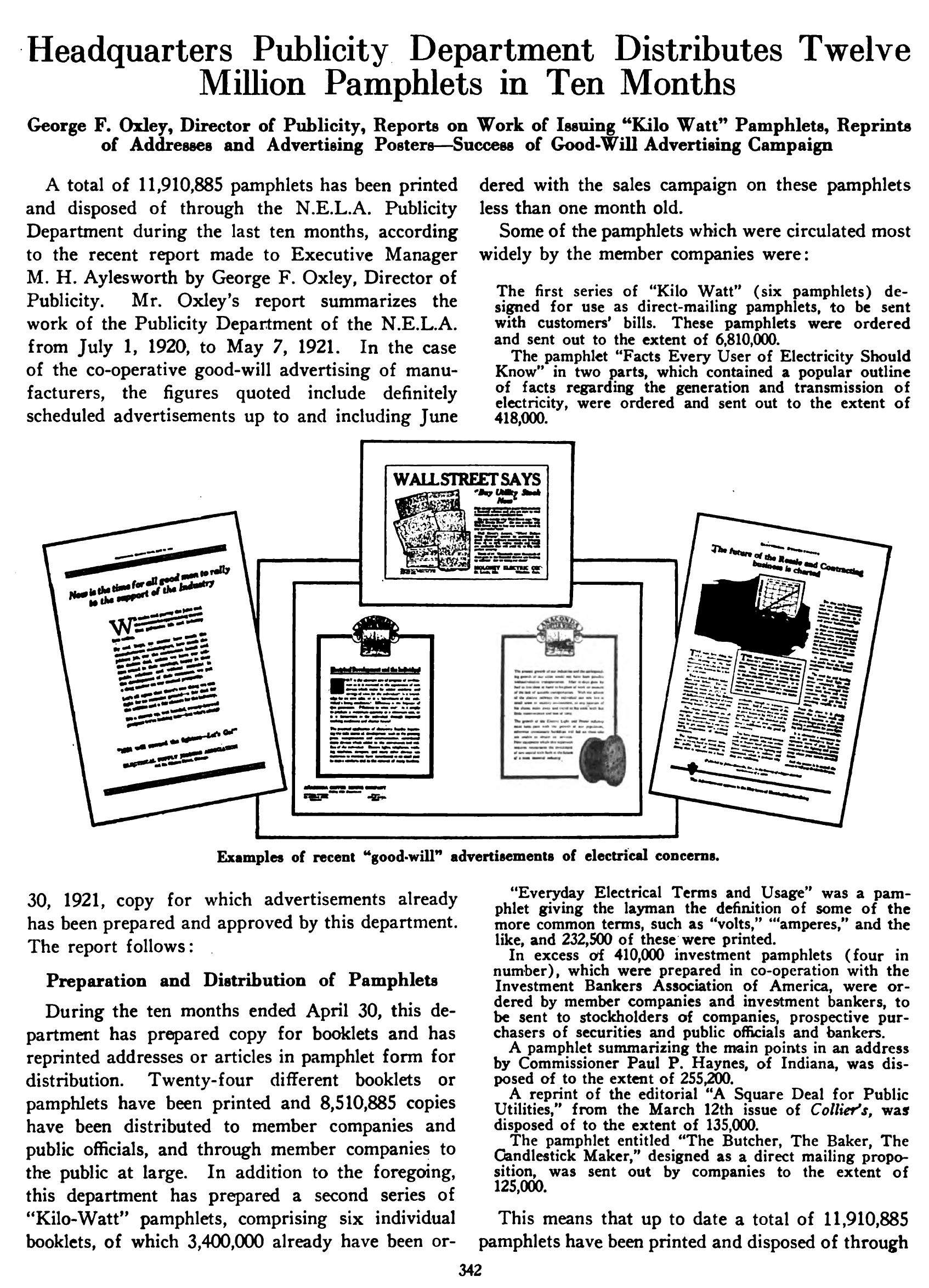
NELA distributes twelve million pamphlets in ten months June 1921 NELA Bulletin

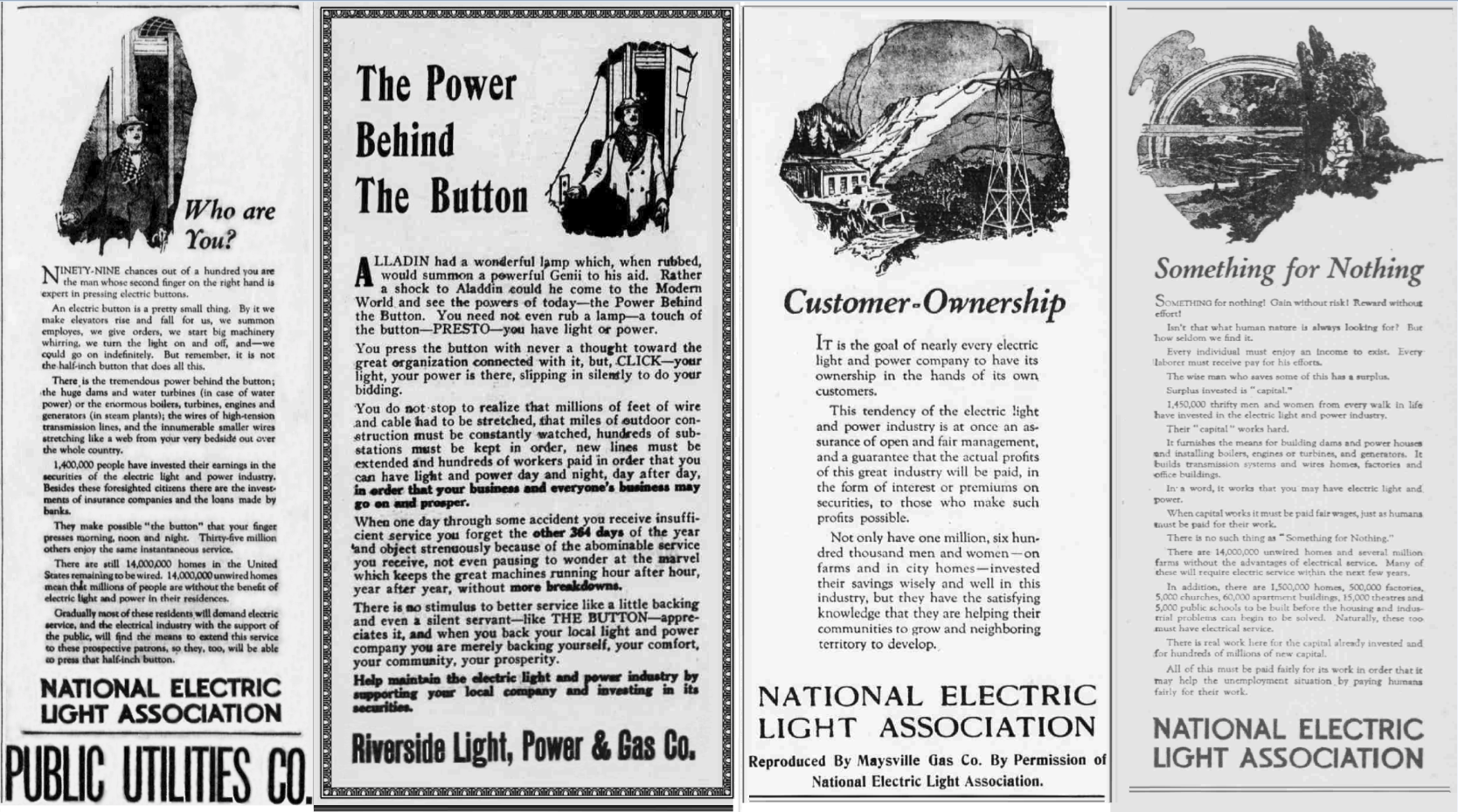
NELA Newspaper Advertisements in U.S. newspapers between 1920 and 1922

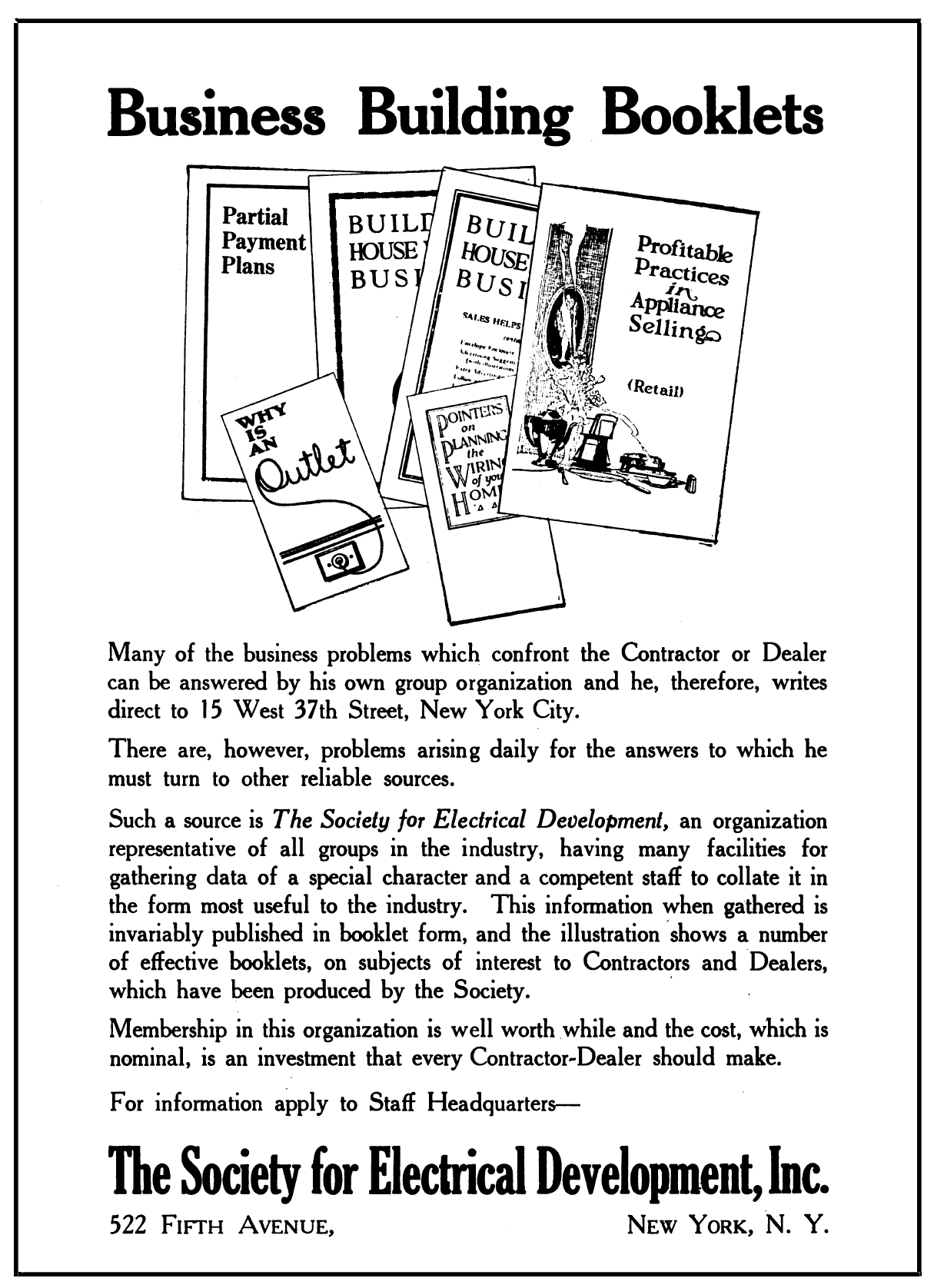
Society for Electrical Development Advertisement of resources available to electric industry 1921

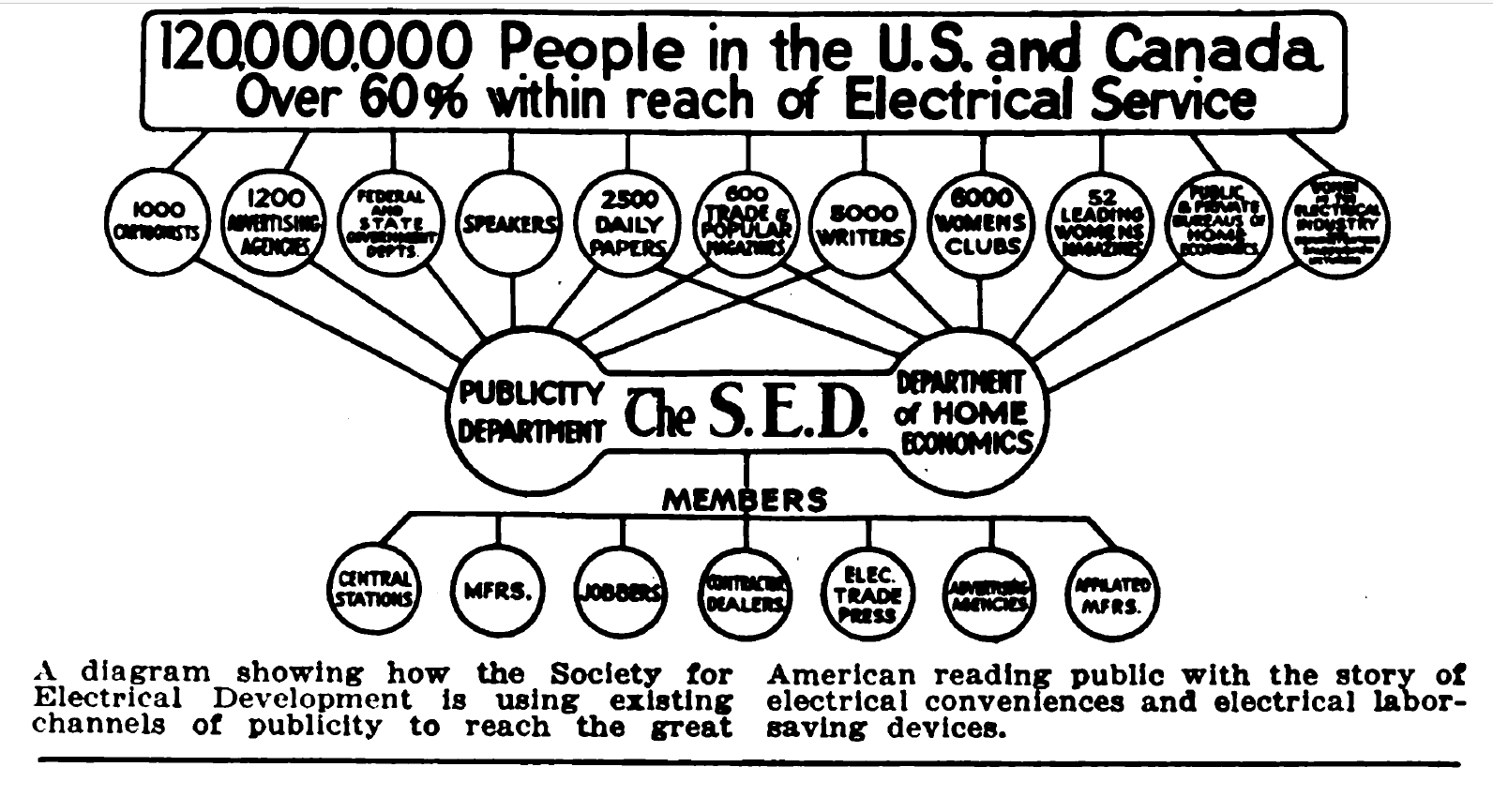
Electrical Merchandizing magazine – Society for Electrical Development chart 1922

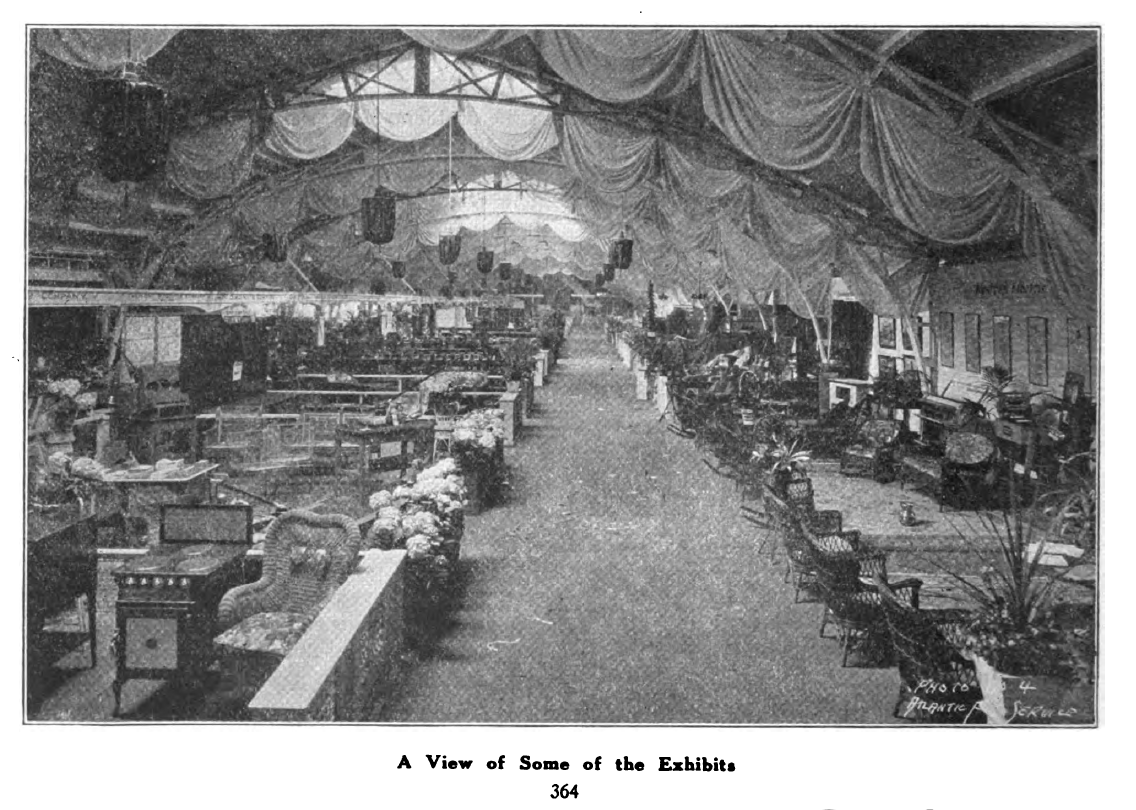
Exhibition all at the National Electric Light Association's convention held May 15–19, 1922 in Atlantic City

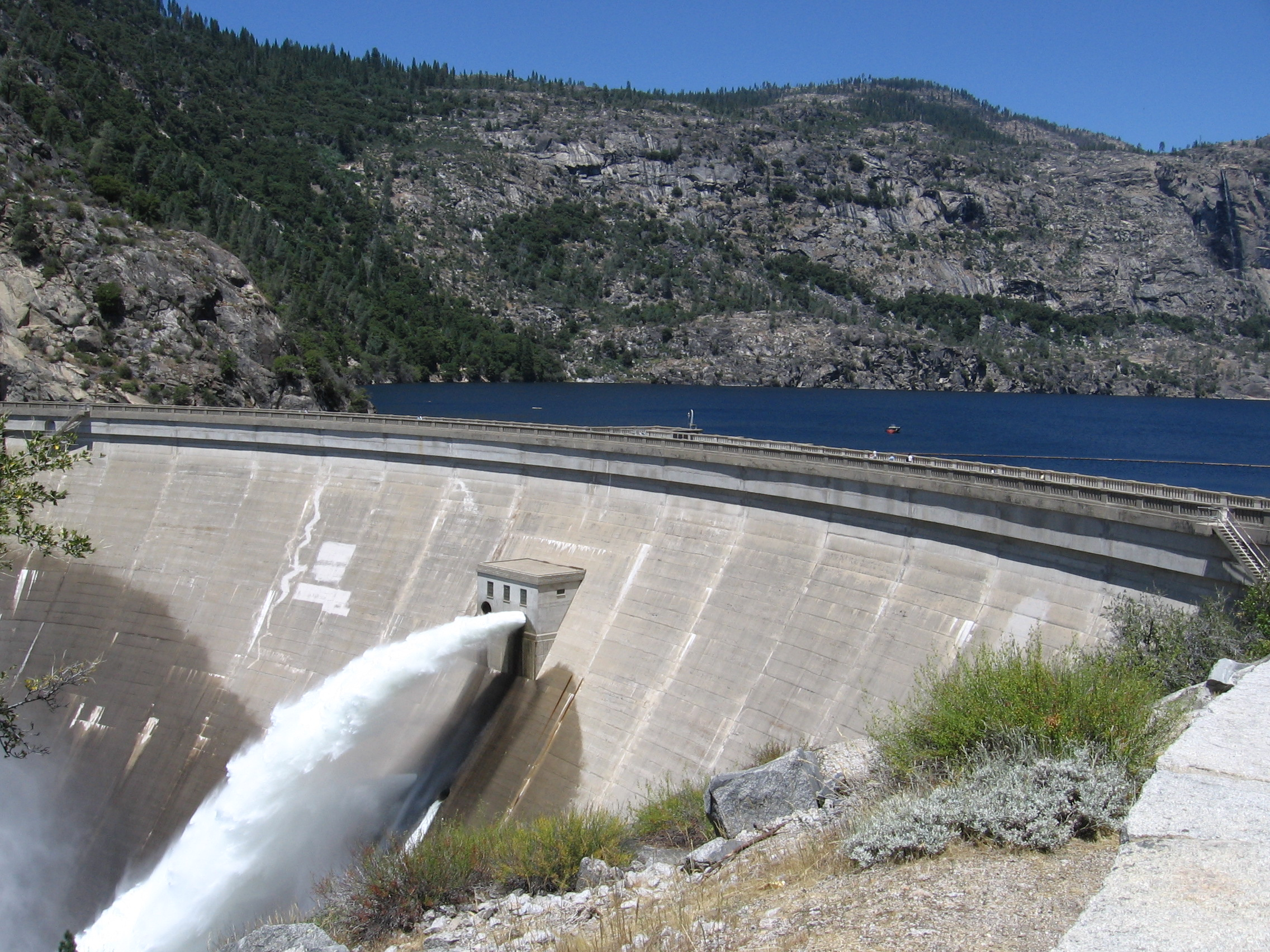
O'Shaugnessy Dam – Hetchy Hetchy Valley

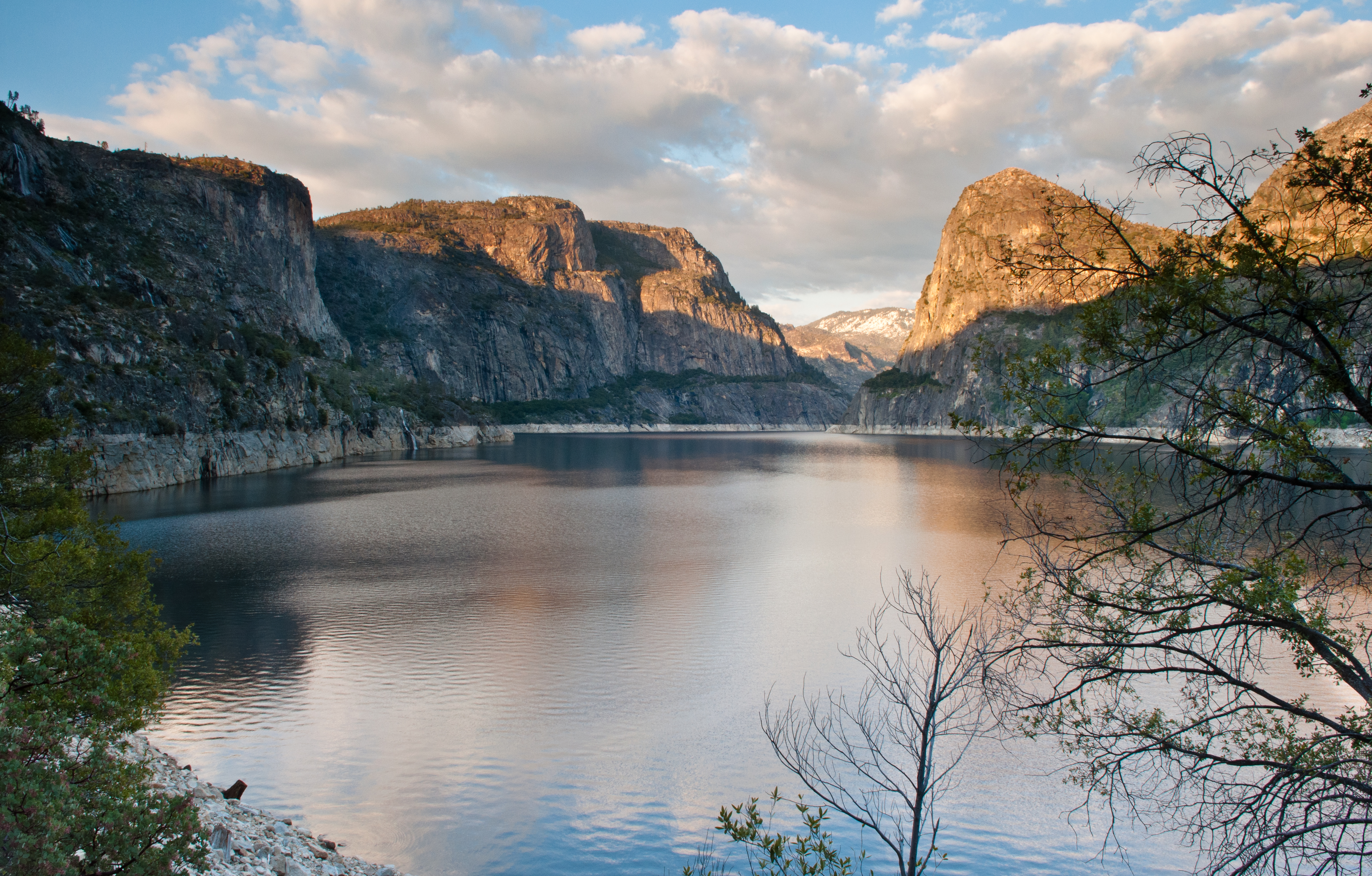
Sunset in Hetch Hetchy

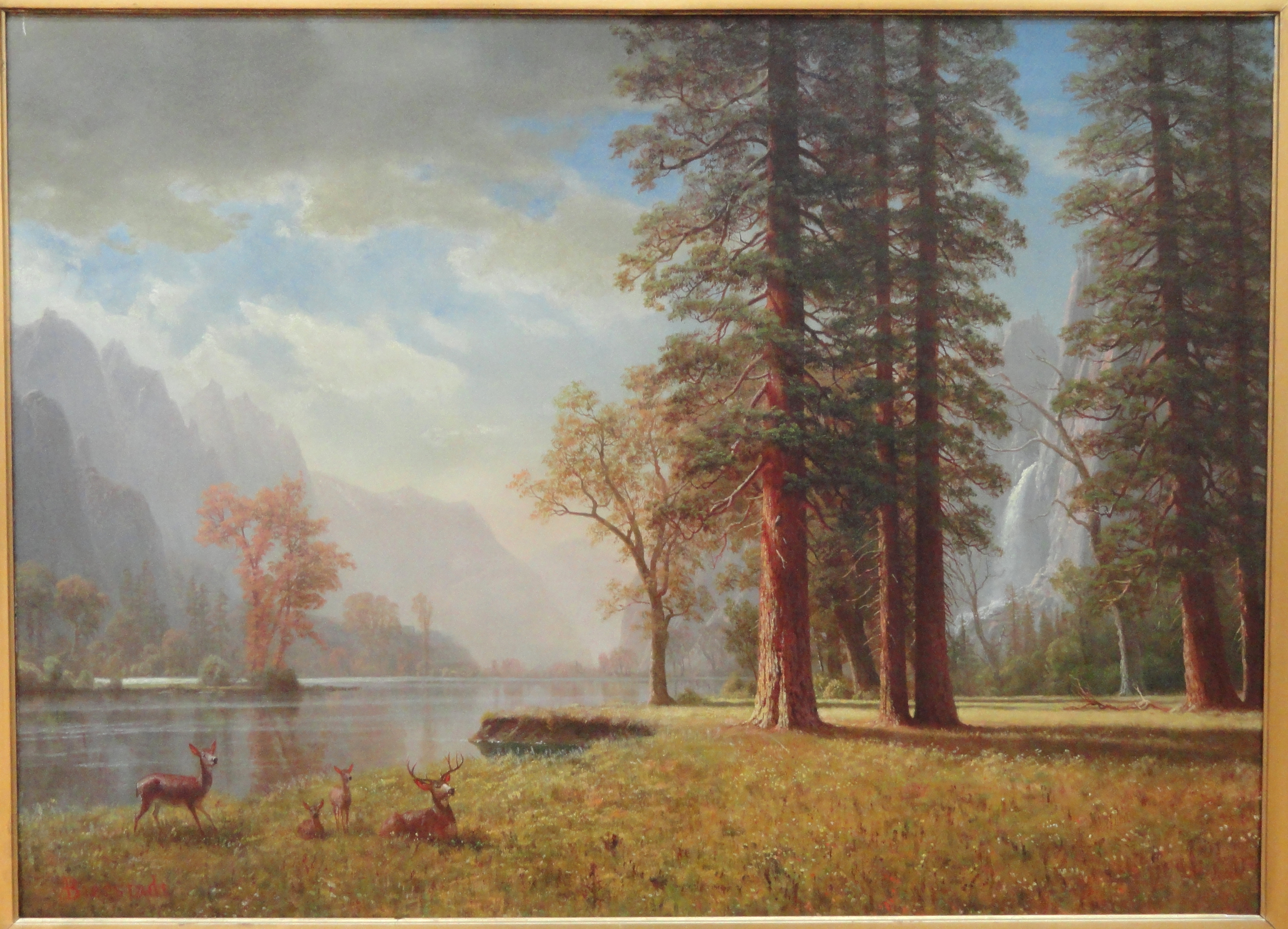
Albert Bierstadt painting of Hetch Hetchy Valley

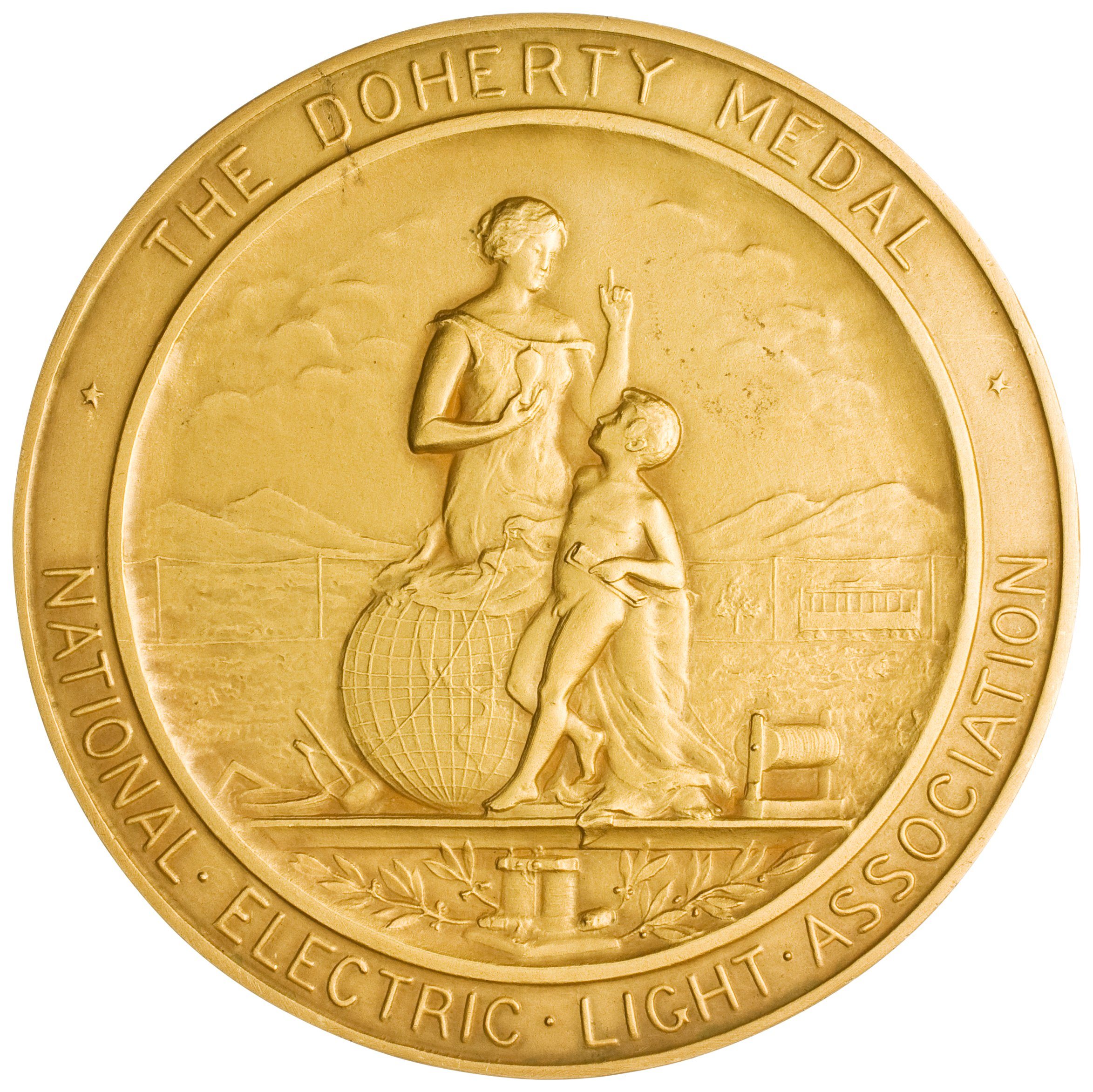
NELA Doherty Medal c. 1929

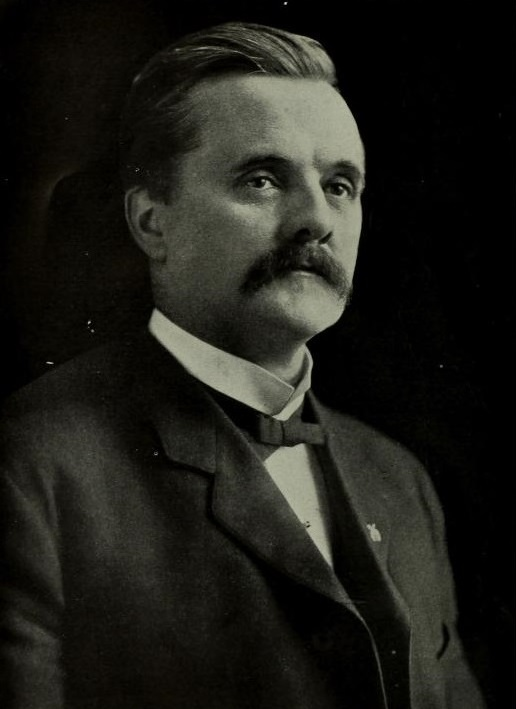
Senator George W. Norris

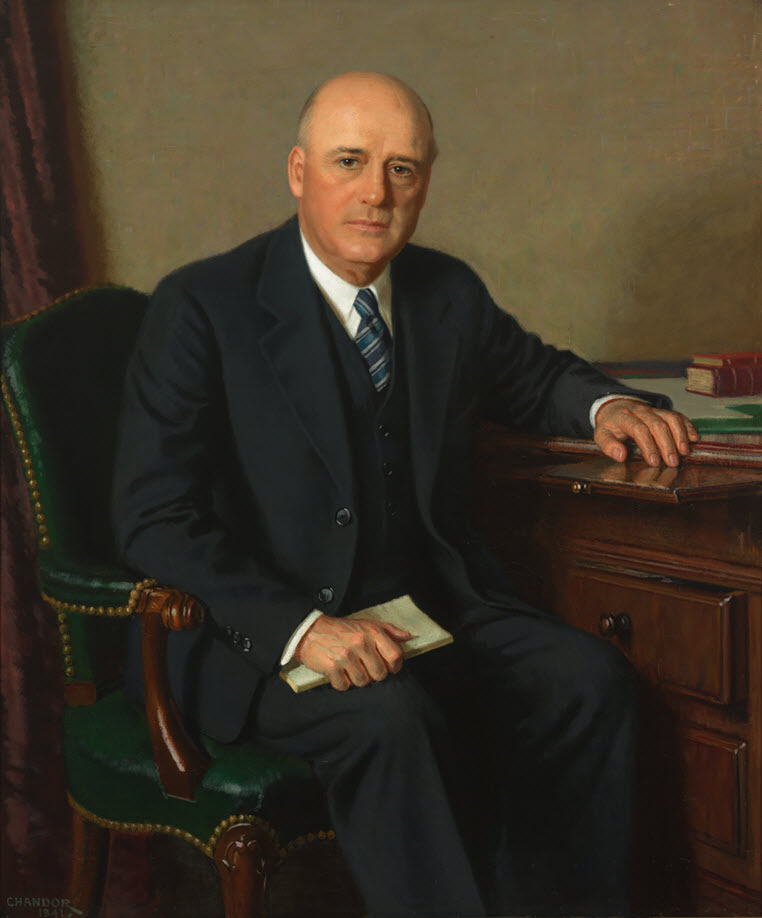
Samuel T. Rayburn

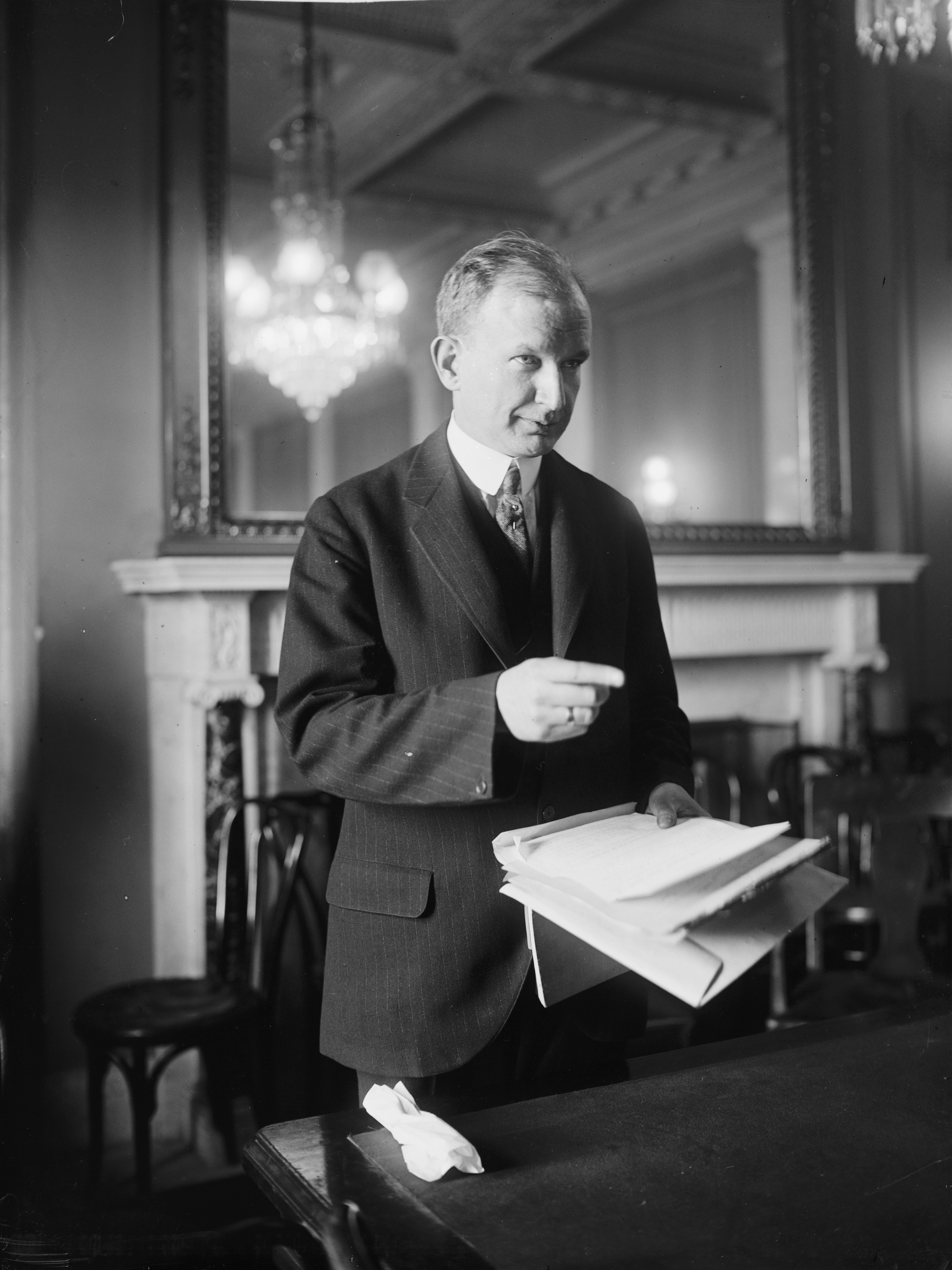
Senator Burton K. Wheeler

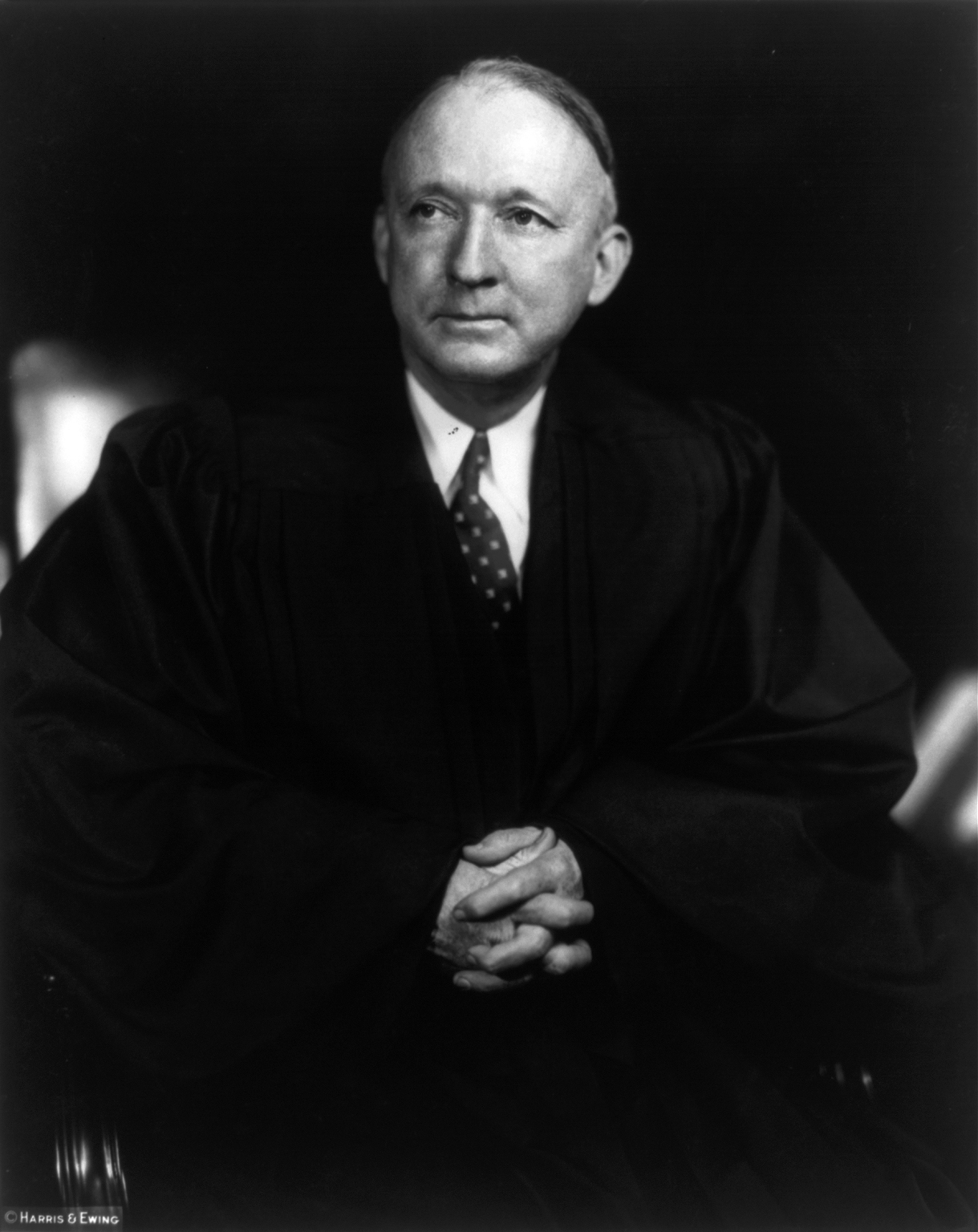
Hugo L. Black
