= Charles Hook =

Charles Hook may refer to:

- Charles R. Hook Sr. (1880–1963), American industrialist
- Charles Christian Hook (1870–1938), American architect

== See also ==
- Charles Hooks (1768–1843), United States representative from North Carolina
- Charles Hook Tompkins (1883–1956), president and co-founder of the Charles H. Tompkins Construction Company
