= Charles Tompkins =

Charles Tompkins may refer to:

- Charles Henry Tompkins (1830–1915), Union Army brevet lieutenant general and colonel from Virginia; Medal of Honor winner
- Charles Henry Tompkins Sr. (1834–1895), Union Army brevet lieutenant general and colonel from Rhode Island
- Charles Hook Tompkins (1883–1956), president and co-founder of the Charles H. Tompkins Construction Company
