= Henry Wallace Clark =

- Henry W. Clark, 1959
- Born: July 27, 1880; St. Louis, Missouri
- Died: April 7, 1948 (aged 67)
- Occupation: President
- Employer(s): Wallace Clark & Co.

Henry Wallace Clark (July 27, 1880 – April 7, 1948) was an American consulting engineer, known for popularizing the work of Henry Gantt with his 1922 work "The Gantt chart; a working tool of management".

In 1934 he was awarded the Henry Laurence Gantt Medal by the ASME. A year after his death the Wallace Clark Award was initiated, an award for distinguished contribution to scientific management in the international field.

== Biography ==
=== Youth and early career ===
Born in Cincinnati, Ohio to William Allen Clark and Mary Ann Clark (born Rankin), Clark attended the local schools, and graduated in 1902 from the University of Cincinnati.

After graduation Clark started his career as assistant manager at the Machine Tool Co. of Cincinnati, and spend one year in the Orient. From 1910 to 1917 he was employed by the Remington Typewriter Company, where he was private secretary to the President. and ended up as office manager. Here Clark met Henry Gantt, who had reorganized the Remington Typewriter factory at Ilion, New York in 1910. From 1919 to 1920 Clark was staff engineer at the H.L. Gantt Company.

=== Further career ===
In 1920 Clark founded his own management consulting company Wallace Clark & Co. in New York, specialized in international management. It grew with offices in London, Berlin Prague, Warsaw, Geneva and Athens. Among his employees was Walter Polakov, who had launching his own consulting company in 1915, and Paul Eugene Holden in the year 1930-31. Another employee was the Frenchman Serge Heranger, who wrote the article "Applying the Gantt Chart in France."

In the 1949 the American Society of Mechanical Engineers (ASME) and three other societies initiated the annual Wallace Clark Award for distinguished contribution to scientific management in the international field.

== Work ==
Clark was "disciple of Henry Gantt", and worked in the tradition of Frederick Taylor and the Scientific management.

=== Scientific management ===
The scientific management movement had originated with Frederick W. Taylor’s 1911 book Scientific Management, in which Taylor argued for the application of physical engineering principles to the organization of manufacturing companies. Clark became one the movement’s more prolific exponents.

Clark wrote several books over the course of his career, including The Gantt Chart: A Working Tool of Management (1922), Shop Office and Forms: Their Design and Use (1925), and The Foreman and His Job (1926).

=== Woodward & Tiernan Printing Company Building ===
In the 1920s Woodward & Tiernan sought to build the most advanced printing plant possible and selected the finest talent to plan and design it. The firm first enlisted Wallace Clark (1880-1948; born Henry Wallace Clark, but publicly listed as Wallace Clark), one of the nation’s foremost industrial engineers, to work with its executives in planning the factory’s interior.

Clark’s recommendations produced a rational factory in which production flowed east to west and from the top down. Such attention to the relationship between building form and the material production inside is a fundamental component of daylight factory design.

=== Studies in Europe ===
In 1926 Clark was selected by Princeton University Professor Edwin W. Kemmerer to study and advise Poland’s government on its industrial practices and was named a Commander of the Cross of Poland Restored for his efforts.

In 1933 he led a commission charged with studying and reorganizing government monopolies in Turkey, and later served as the American representative on industrial engineering to the International Labor Office in Switzerland.

=== Implementation of the Gantt chart in Europe and Britain ===
In a 2015 article, Daniel A. Wren, traced the implementation of the Gantt chart in Europe, and especially in Britain. He found, that:

"... developed to meet the shipbuilding and use needs for the Great War (World War I), the Gantt chart was disseminated through the work of Wallace Clark during the 1930s in numerous public sector and private organizations in 12 nations. The Gantt concept was applied in a variety of industries and firms using batch, continuous processing and/or sub-assembly lines in mass production. Traditional scientific management techniques were expanded for general management, such as financial requirement through budgetary control. Clark and his consulting firm were responsible for implementing a managerial tool, the Gantt chart, in an international setting. Research limitations/implications."

== Publications ==
- Clark, Wallace, Walter Nicholas Polakov, and Frank W. Trabold. The Gantt chart: A working tool of management. The Ronald Press Company, 1922; 1952.
- Clark, Wallace. Shop and office forms: Their design and use. McGraw-Hill, 1925.
- Clark, Wallace. A Control Chart for the Chief Executive. 1925.
- Clark, Wallace. Production Planning and Control: 15.92, Industrial Problems (defense Production). Wallace Clark & Co, Massachusetts Institute of Technology 1941

Articles, a selection:

- Wallace Clark. "Training of Office Workers," in: Management Review, March 1922. p. 7-10
- Clark, Wallace. "Relieving industry of burden." Mechanical Engineering, December (1922): 819-820.
- Clark, Wallace. "Executive Control of Future Results." Mgmt. & Admr (1924).
- Wallace Clark, Otto T. Mallery, H.R. Woods, Darwin J. Meserole and Woodlief Thomas. "Government Expenditures and Business Stability]: Discussion." Proceedings of the Academy of Political Science in the City of New York. Vol. 12, No. 3, Stabilizing Business (Jul., 1927), pp. 129–135
