= Spurr =

Spurr may refer to:

- Spurr Township, Michigan
- Mount Spurr, a volcano in Alaska
- Spurr (crater), a lunar crater

People

- Arthur Clinton Spurr, American lawyer
- Frederic C. Spurr (1861–1942), English Baptist minister in Australia
- Josiah Edward Spurr, American geologist and explorer (eponym of the volcano and crater)
- Laura Spurr, Tribal Chairwoman, Nottawaseppi Huron Band of the Potawatomi
- Stephen Spurr, English public school headmaster
- Tommy Spurr, English football player
- Robert Spurr, rugby league footballer of the 1960s, 1970s and 1980s

== See also ==
- Spur (disambiguation)
