= Walker-Turner =

Walker-Turner Co.
- Founders: Ernest T. Walker; William Brewer Turner
- Headquarters: Plainfield, New Jersey, United States
- Parent: Kearney and Trecker (1948-1956); Rockwell Manufacturing Co. (from 1956)

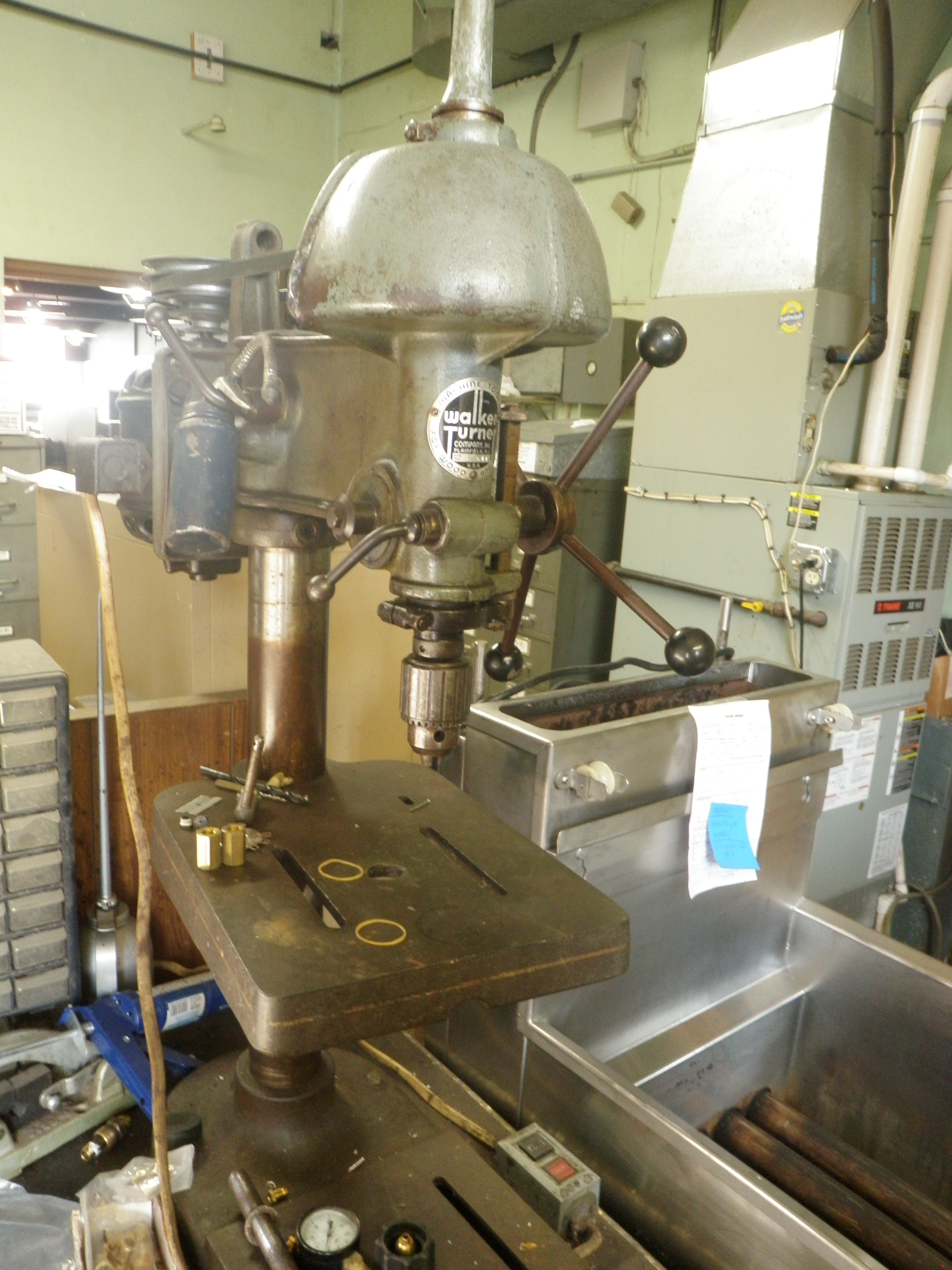
Benchtop Walker-Turner Drill Press

Walker-Turner Co. was founded around the end of the 1920s by Ernest T. Walker and William Brewer Turner, who built machines for home and light industrial use. It was acquired by Rockwell Manufacturing Co. in 1956 and Walker-Turner branded machines continued to be sold into the 1960s.

== History ==
Walker-Turner was founded by Ernest T. Walker and William Brewer Turner sometime around 1927 and 1929. The company was first located in Jersey City, New Jersey until 1931 when they relocated to Plainfield, New Jersey. The first machines Walker-Turner made were small, inexpensive, light-weight machines designed for home workshops of the time.

- On Feb 17, 1931 the Plainfield, New Jersey Chamber of Commerce announced that Walker-Turner had purchased “the Rushmore Plant at South Ave. and Berckman St.” at 639 South Avenue which had formerly been occupied by the Bosch Magneto Company.
- In 1934 Walker-Turner introduced the 500, 700, and 900 series of their machine lines known as "The Driver Line". The 500 line included the smallest and lightest of these new machines while the 700 and 900 series consisted of beefier and more industrial styled machines.
- In 1936 the first 1100 series machines were introduced, the TA1150 table saw and BN1125 band saw. Also this same year, they expanded with the purchase of the Rivoli Silk Hosiery plant at 768 North Avenue which added 33,000 sq. feet and would become their shipping department.
- In 1938 Walker-Turner began its direct geared motor drive machines. They were the MJ744 and MJ917 jig saws, TA990 and TA1162 table saws, and the S980 shaper.
- In 1939 Walker-Turner started adding an Art Deco redesign to many of the 700, 900, and 1100 series machines. This same year drill presses came to the fore as they began to offer custom multi-headed setups for production work. This year also marked the beginning of the company adding serial numbers to many of their models. There is no reliably structured format to these number, other than the final two digits often designate the year that the model began production.
- Starting in 1940, Walker-Turner discarded much of the 1939 Art Deco redesigns it had done to the 700, 900, and 1100 series of its machines. Only the 900 and 1100 series band saws retain the 1939 Art Deco design. This year they introduced their first radial arm saw, the RA1100. Also this year Walker-Turner organized behind the United Electrical, Radio and Machine Workers of America (a C.I.O. union), lack of progress in contract negotiations led to a five-week long strike. The strike, most notably delayed a shipment of some 300 drill presses to Great Britain for use in making shells for the war effort. Ernest Walker, who was vice president at the time described the shipment as "So important to Britain's armament they had been given priority over all other shipments out of New York harbor.”
- In 1942, Walker-Turner released its first Radial Arm Drill Press, the RD-1170.

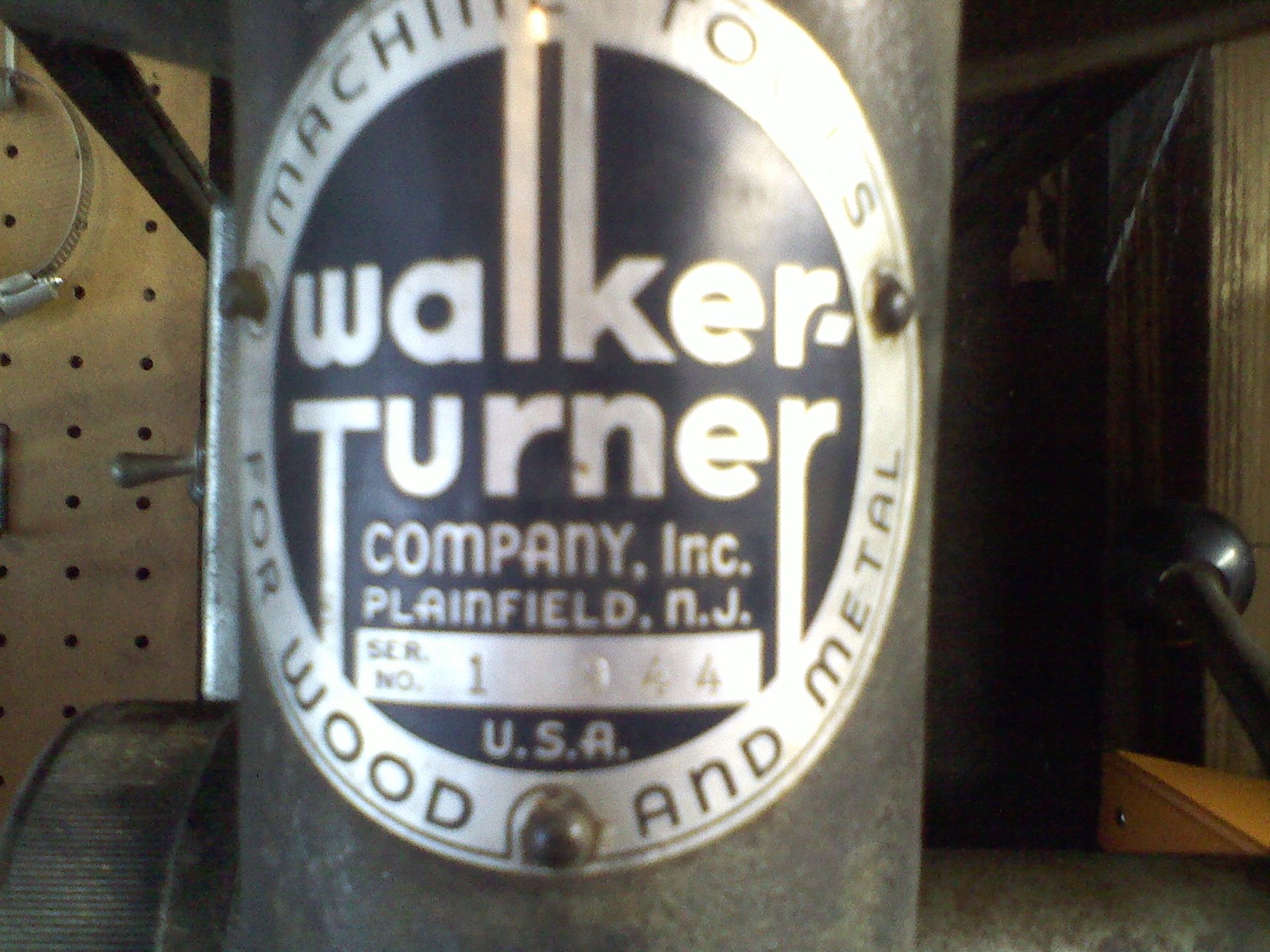
900 Series Drill Press, Serial # 1 944

Through 1942-1945, during the years of the United States' involvement in World War II, much of Walker-Turner's production capacity was focused on the war effort. Catalogs and other documentation from this period may be scarce. Due to paper shortages, some model years may not have had catalogs printed at all and other years likely saw limited print runs. During this time frame, Walker-Turner's first 20" drill press, the D-1100 is introduced.

- In 1948, Walker-Turner was sold to Milwaukee machine tool maker Kearney and Trecker and the company becomes "Walker-Turner Division of Kearney & Trecker". Production continued still at the existing facility at Plainfield. Under a new name, all new machines are re-badged from saying "Walker-Turner company Inc." to "Walker-Turner Division of Kearney & Trecker Corporation".
- Starting in April 1950 new serial numbers are brought into use. These new serials are formatted YYMSQD where YY is the year of manufacture, M is the type of machine, S is the specific model of machine, Q is the quarter of the year of manufacture, and D notes deviation from the standard model.
- In 1952 a new plant is constructed at 900 South Avenue in Plainfield.
- In 1956 Kearney & Trecker sells Walker-Turner to Rockwell Manufacturing Co.
- In 1957 Rockwell ceases production in Plainfield and closes all former Walker-Turner facilities. Production of Walker-Turner badged machines moves to Bellefontaine, Ohio and Tupelo, Mississippi.
