= Henry Laurence Gantt Medal =

The Henry Laurence Gantt Medal was established in 1929 by the American Management Association and the Management section of the American Society of Mechanical Engineers for "distinguished achievement in management and service to the community" in honour of Henry Laurence Gantt. By the year 1984 in total 45 medals had been awarded.

== Award winners ==
=== 20th-century winners ===
- 1929: Henry Laurence Gantt (posthumously)
- 1930: Fred J. Miller,
- 1931: Leon Pratt Alford
- 1932: Henry S. Dennison
- 1933: Henry Wallace Clark
- 1934: Horace B. Cheney
- 1935: Arthur Howland Young
- 1936: Morris Evans Leeds (1869–1952)
- 1940: William Loren Batt
- 1941: Paul Eugene Holden
- 1943: Dexter S. Kimball
- 1944: Frank Bunker Gilbreth Sr. (posthumously) and Lillian Moller Gilbreth
- 1945: John Milton Hancock
- 1946: Paul G. Hoffman
- 1947: Alvin E. Dodd
- 1948: Harold Fowler McCormick
- 1949: Arthur Clinton Spurr
- 1950: Charles R. Hook Sr.
- 1951: Thomas Roy Jones
- 1952: Frank Henry Neely (1884–1979)
- 1953: Thomas E. Millsop
- 1954: Clarence Francis
- 1955: Walker Lee Cisler
- 1956: Henning Webb Prentis Jr.
- 1957: Harold F. Smiddy
- 1958: Richard Redwood Deupree
- 1959: Peter Drucker
- 1960: Charles McCormick
- 1961: Lyndall Urwick
- 1962: Austin J. Tobin
- 1963: Lawrence A. Appley
- 1964: Harold Bright Maynard
- 1965: Ralph J. Cordiner
- 1968: J. Erik Jonsson
- 1969: Dave Packard
- 1970: Frederick R. Kappel
- 1971: Donald C. Burnham
- 1972: Robert Elton Brooker
- 1973: John T. Connor
- 1974: Willard Rockwell
- 1975: Patrick E. Haggerty
- 1976: Kenneth Daniel
- 1982: Charles Luckman
- 1983: Walter A. Fallon
- 1984: Rawleigh Warner Jr.
- 1987: Edmund T. Pratt Jr.
- 1988: William S. Lee
- 1996: George N. Hatsopoulos

=== 21st-century winners ===
- 2000: Paul Soros
- 2001: Roy Huffington
- 2002: Alexander W. Dreyfoos Jr.
- 2003: William R. Timken
- 2004: Julie Spicer England
- 2006: Charla K. Wise
- 2007: Dean L. Kamen
- 2009: Charles M. Vest
- 2018: Todd R. Allen
- 2019: Margaret G. McCullough
- 2023: Guru Madhavan
