= Paul Holden =

Paul Holden may refer to:

== Sportspeople ==
- Paul Holden (ice hockey) in 1988–89 Los Angeles Kings season
- Paul Holden (hurler) in Kilkenny Minor Hurling Team 2010

== Others ==
- Sir Paul Holden, 7th Baronet (born 1923) of the Holden baronets
- Paul Holden (judge) in United States Court of Military Commission Review
- Paul Holden (musician) from Southend (band)
- Paul Eugene Holden (1893–1976), American mechanical engineer
- P. J. Holden, comic artist
