= Arthur Young =

Arthur Young may refer to:

== Politicians ==
- Sir Arthur Young (colonial administrator) (1854–1938), British governor of the Straits Settlements
- Sir Arthur Young, 1st Baronet (1889–1950), Scottish Unionist Party member of parliament (MP)
- Sir Arthur Young (police officer) (1907–1979), commissioner of the City of London Police
- Arthur Young (Australian politician) (1816–1906), member of the Tasmanian House of Assembly
- Arthur Herbert Young (1873–1943), Pitcairn Islands politician

== Business ==
- Arthur Young (accountant) (1863–1948), founder of the accountancy company which became Ernst & Young in 1989
- Arthur Young (architect) (1853–1924), English architect
- Arthur Young (agriculturist) (1741–1820), English agriculturist, writer and economist (son of Arthur Young the divine)
- Arthur Howland Young (1882–1964), American engineer and vice president of US Steel

== Sports ==
- Arthur Young (rugby union, born 1855) (1855–1938), Scotland international rugby union player
- Arthur Young (rugby union, born 1901) (1901–1933), English rugby union player
- Arthur Young (footballer) (fl. 1906), Scottish footballer

== Arts ==
- Arthur Young (actor) (1898–1959), English actor
- Art Young (1866–1943), American cartoonist and writer
- Arthur M. Young (1905–1995), American inventor and philosopher

== Other people ==
- Arthur Young (divine) (1693–1759), English clergyman and divine
- Arthur Young (shooting victim) (died 2012), Belizean alleged gang leader
- Arthur N. Young (1890–1984), American economist and U.S. government official

== Other uses ==
- SS Art Young, a Liberty ship
