= Hoover Medal =

American engineering prize

Jimmy Carter's 1998 Hoover Medal

The Hoover Medal is an American engineering prize.

It has been given since 1930 for "outstanding extra-career services by engineers to humanity". The prize is given jointly by the American Institute of Chemical Engineers, American Institute of Mining, Metallurgical, and Petroleum Engineers, American Society of Civil Engineers, Institute of Electrical and Electronics Engineers, and American Society of Mechanical Engineers (ASME), which administers it. It is named for Herbert Hoover, the first recipient, who was an engineer by profession.

== Past recipients ==
Source: ASME

- 1930 Herbert Hoover
- 1936 Ambrose Swasey
- 1938 John Frank Stevens
- 1940 Gano Dunn
- 1941 D. Robert Yarnall
- 1942 Gerard Swope
- 1944 Ralph E. Flanders
- 1945 William Henry Harrison
- 1946 Vannevar Bush
- 1948 Malcolm Pirnie
- 1949 Frank B. Jewett
- 1950 Karl T. Compton
- 1951 William L. Batt
- 1952 Clarence D. Howe
- 1954 Alfred P. Sloan Jr.
- 1955 Charles F. Kettering
- 1956 Herbert Hoover Jr.
- 1957 Scott Turner
- 1958 Raymond A. Wheeler
- 1959 Henry T. Heald
- 1960 Dwight D. Eisenhower
- 1961 Mervin J. Kelly
- 1962 Walker Lee Cisler
- 1963 James Rhyne Killian Jr.
- 1964 John Alexander McCone
- 1966 Lillian Moller Gilbreth
- 1967 Lucius D. Clay
- 1968 Sir Harold Hartley
- 1969 Edgar F. Kaiser
- 1970 John Erik Jonsson
- 1971 Luis A. Ferré
- 1972 Frederick R. Kappel
- 1973 William Joseph Hedley
- 1974 David Packard
- 1975 James Boyd
- 1976 James B. Fisk
- 1977 Peter C. Goldmark
- 1978 Donald C. Burnham
- 1979 Charles M. Brinckerhoff
- 1980 Stephen D. Bechtel Jr.
- 1981 Arnold O. Beckman
- 1982 Michel T. Halbouty
- 1983 Joseph J. Jacobs
- 1984 Kenneth A. Roe
- 1985 Robert C. West
- 1986 Lawrence P. Grayson
- 1987 Martin Goland
- 1988 William R. Gianelli
- 1989 John J. McKetta
- 1990 Joseph M. Rodgers
- 1991 Haldor F. Topsoe
- 1992 Roland W. Schmitt
- 1993 Mario G. Salvadori
- 1994 William J. Carroll
- 1995 Dean Kamen
- 1996 M. Hasan Nouri
- 1997 Otto J. Helweg
- 1998 James Earl Carter Jr.
- 2001 Richard H. Stanley
- 2002 Charles H. Thornton
- 2003 Barry K. Thacker
- 2005 Sudabeh Shoja
- 2007 Bernard Amadei
- 2008 A. P. J. Abdul Kalam
- 2012 N. R. Narayana Murthy
- 2013 Steve Wozniak
- 2015 Robert S. Langer
- 2016 Leonard Harris, Australia
- 2017 John Staehlin
- 2018 David C. Baldwin
- 2019 Marc Edwards
- 2020 William S. Hammack
- 2021 Cato T. Laurencin
- 2022 Ratan Tata

== See also ==
- List of engineering awards
- List of mechanical engineering awards
- List of awards for contributions to society
- List of awards named after people
