= David W. Stewart (academic) =

American marketing scholar and psychologist

- Born: 1951 (age 74–75)
- Known for: Marketing communication, advertising effectiveness, marketing accountability, consumer behavior, marketing and public policy

Academic background
- Education: Northeast Louisiana University (B.A.); Baylor University (M.A., Ph.D.)

Academic work
- Institutions: Vanderbilt University; University of Southern California; University of California, Riverside; Loyola Marymount University
- Notable works: Focus Groups: Theory and Practice (1990; 2015, 3rd ed.); Marketing Champions (2006); Accountable Marketing (2016); Financial Dimensions of Marketing Decisions (2019); Maladaptive Consumer Behavior (2024)

David W. Stewart is an American marketing scholar, psychologist, and academic administrator. He is Emeritus President's Professor at the Loyola Marymount University. He is known for his research on marketing communication, consumer behavior, research methods, advertising effectiveness, marketing accountability, and the intersection of marketing and public policy. He has held senior academic roles at Vanderbilt University, the University of Southern California, the University of California, Riverside, and Loyola Marymount University. His publications have been cited over 37,000 times, and he has been listed among the top 2% of researchers in business and management.

== Early life and education ==
Stewart earned his B.A. in psychology from Northeast Louisiana University and his M.A. and Ph.D. in psychology from Baylor University.

== Academic career ==
Stewart joined the faculty of Vanderbilt University in 1980, where he taught in the Owen Graduate School of Management and served as Senior Associate Dean for Academic Affairs. He also held a joint appointment in psychology and human development at Peabody College.

In 1986, he joined the University of Southern California (USC) Marshall School of Business, where he was promoted to professor and later appointed the Robert E. Brooker Professor of Marketing. During more than two decades at USC, he chaired the Department of Marketing and served as Deputy Dean, overseeing faculty governance and academic affairs.

From 2007 to 2012, Stewart was Professor of Management and Marketing and Dean of the School of Business Administration at the University of California, Riverside, where he oversaw the reorganization of the business school, expansion of programs, and regional economic development initiatives.

In 2012, he was appointed President's Professor of Marketing and Business Law at Loyola Marymount University, a role he held until 2021, after which he was named emeritus professor. He has also held visiting appointments, including as Visiting Professor at the Leeds University Business School in 2018.

== Research and scholarship ==
Stewart's research spans marketing strategy, consumer behavior, advertising effectiveness, research methods, the assessment of marketing effectiveness, and the relationship between marketing and public policy. He is particularly noted for his work on the design and interpretation of advertising research, the economic value of brands, and marketing accountability, linking marketing actions to financial performance.

His book Focus Groups: Theory and Practice (1990; 2015, 3rd ed.) is considered a foundational methodological text and has been translated into multiple languages. Other major works include Marketing Champions (2006), Accountable Marketing (2016), Financial Dimensions of Marketing Decisions (2019), and Maladaptive Consumer Behavior (2024). Stewart has published widely in journals including the Journal of Marketing, Journal of Public Policy & Marketing, Journal of Marketing Research, Journal of Consumer Research, Journal of Retailing, and Journal of Advertising Research, with more than 36,000 citations to his work.

He has served as editor of the Journal of Marketing, the Journal of the Academy of Marketing Science, the Journal of Public Policy & Marketing, and as co-editor of thematic issues on advertising, accountability, and emerging technologies.

== Professional service ==
Stewart is a Founding Chair of the Marketing Accountability Standards Board (MASB), serving since 2004 and as Acting President and CEO in 2022. He has been active in the American Marketing Association (AMA) as Vice President of Finance (1999), Vice President of Publications (2017–2020), a board member, and faculty leader in international doctoral consortia.

He has also served as President of the Society for Consumer Psychology and as Chair of the Section of Statistics of the American Statistical Association. Stewart has served on the editorial boards of more than 25 journals.

== Honors and recognition ==
- William L. Wilkie "Marketing for a Better World" Award, American Marketing Association (2025)
- Fellow, American Marketing Association (2021)
- Margaret H. Blair Award for Marketing Accountability (2021)
- Marketing and Society Lifetime Achievement Award, AMA MASSIG (2015)
- Elsevier Distinguished Marketing Scholar, Society for Marketing Advances (2007)
- Cutco/Vector Distinguished Marketing Educator Award, Academy of Marketing Science (2006)
- Ivan Preston Outstanding Contribution to Research Award, American Academy of Advertising (1998)
- Fellow, American Psychological Association and Association for Psychological Science
- Ingolstadt Legacy Award for Business and Economics in Service of Humanity (2019)
- Chinese Scholar Marketing Association Fellow Award (2020)

== Selected publications ==
- Stewart, D. W., & Shamdasani, P. (1990; 2015, 3rd ed.). Focus Groups: Theory and Practice. Sage.
- Stewart, D. W., Young, R., & Weiss, A. (2006). Marketing Champions: Practical Strategies for Improving Marketing's Power, Influence and Business Impact. Wiley.
- Stewart, D. W. (2015). Handbook of Persuasion and Social Marketing. Praeger.
- Stewart, D. W., & Gugel, C. (2016). Accountable Marketing: Linking Marketing Actions to Financial Performance. Routledge.
- Stewart, D. W. (2018). A Primer on Consumer Behavior: A Guide for Managers. Business Expert Press.
- Stewart, D. W. (2019). Financial Dimensions of Marketing Decisions. Palgrave.
- Stewart, D. W., & Martin, I. (2024). Maladaptive Consumer Behavior: Theory, Behavior, and Intervention. Palgrave.
- Stewart, D. W., Raithel, S., Mafael, A., & Taylor, C. R. (2025). Winning the Advertising Game: Lessons from the Super Bowl Ad Champions. Springer.

== Articles ==
- Martin, Ingrid, and Davie W. Stewart. "A Marketing Perspective on Maladaptive Consumption and Product Regulation," Journal of Public Policy and Marketing, 43(4), 235-253.
- Punj, Girish N., and David W. Stewart. "Cluster Analysis in Marketing Research: Review and Suggestions for Application Journal of Marketing Research, 20(2), 134-148.
- Stewart, David W. "The Application and Misapplication of Factor Analysis in Marketing Research," Journal of Marketing Research, 18(1), 51-62.
