= List of mayors of Weirton, West Virginia =

This is a list of mayors of Weirton, West Virginia, United States of America.

== Mayors ==
Name	Term	Reference
Thomas E. Millsop	1947–1955	
Samuel Kusic	1955–1959	
David T. Frew	1959–1963	
Frank A. Rybka	1963–1971	
Mike A. Andochick Jr.	1971–1979	
Donald T. Mentzer	1979–1987	
Edwin J. Bowman	1987–1995	
Dean M. Harris	1995–2003	
William M. Miller	2003–2007	
Mark Harris	2007–2011	
George Kondik	2011–2015	
Harold Miller	2015–2025	
Dean Harris	2025-Present	

== See also ==
- Weirton, West Virginia
