= Wallace Clark Award =

The Wallace Clark Award or Wallace Clark Medal is a former management award for Distinguished Contribution to Scientific Management, named after Henry Wallace Clark (1880–1948). The Wallace Clark Award was established in 1949 and was sponsored by the American Management Association (AMA), the American Society of Mechanical Engineers (ASME), the Association for Consulting Management Engineers and the Society for the Advancement of Management.

The first Wallace Clark Medal was in 1948 awarded in the Swiss Hugo de Haan, who was in those days executive secretary of Comite International de l'Organisation Scientifique (CIOS). This organization was dedicated to the promotion of scientific management worldwide, and was founded in the first International Management Congress at Prague in 1924.

== Award winners ==
- 1949. Hugo de Haan
- 1950. Theodore Limperg
- 1951. Lillian Gilbreth
- 1953. Erwin H. Schell
- 1954. Harold Bright Maynard
- 1955. Lyndall Urwick
- 1957. Walter Scott
- 1958. Harold F. Smiddy
- 1960. Berend Willem Berenschot
- 1963. Peter Drucker
- 1965. Phil Carroll
- 1966. K. S. Basu
- 1967. Joseph M. Juran
- 1968. Gerrit van der Wal
- 1969. Dwayne Orton
