= Erwin H. Schell =

- Born: 29 September 1889
- Died: 1965
- Occupation(s): engineer organizational theorist management author MIT Sloan School of Management dean

Erwin Haskell Schell (29 Sept. 1889 – 1965) was an American engineer, organizational theorist, management author and Dean of the MIT Department of Business and Engineering from 1930 through 1951. The school later became the MIT Sloan School of Management.

== Biography ==
=== Youth and early career ===
Born in Kalamazoo, Michigan in 1889, Schell obtained his BSc from MIT in 1912.

After his graduation Schell started his career in industry as operation manager for the American Locomotive Company in Rhode Island in 1912–13. Next he was resident engineer for H.C. Reynes, Inc. for two years; industrial engineer and labor manager for the United States Cartridge Company in 1915–16; Treasurer at the Henry F. Miller & Sons Piano Company for another years; and industrial engineer at the American International Shipbuilding Corporation for another two years.

=== Further career ===
In 1917, Schell became an assistant professor of business management at MIT, a role he served for ten years. In 1929, he was appointed assistant professor of Industrial Management and chair of the department of business management since 1931.

From 1921 to 1923 Schell participated in the Management Counsel of the American International Corporation. And from 1924 to 1928 he was also assistant professor of industrial management at the Harvard University Graduate School of Business Administration.

In 1938 he was awarded the Gilbreth Medal by the Society for the Advancements of Management, and in 1958 the Wallace Clark Award.

== Selected publications ==
- Schell, Erwin Haskell, and Harold Hazen Thurlby. Problems in industrial management. AW Shaw Company, 1927.
- Schell, Erwin Haskell. Administrative proficiency in business. (1936).
- Schell, Erwin Haskell. New strength for new leadership. (1942).
- Schell, Erwin Haskell. The Technique of Executive Action. (1942).
- Schell, Erwin Haskell. Technique of executive control. (1950).
- Schell, Erwin Haskell. Technique of Administration. Mcgraw-hill, New York, 1951.
