= Walter Polakov =

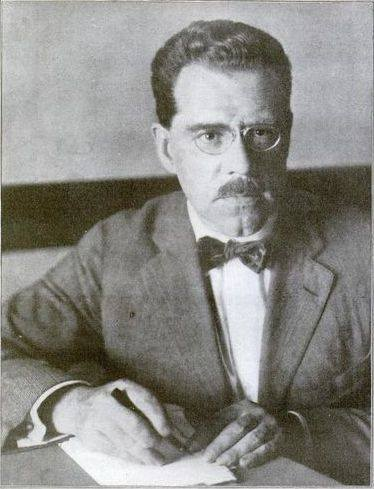
Walter Nicholas Polakov

Walter Nicholas Polakov (July 18, 1879 – December 20, 1948) was a mechanical engineer, consulting engineer, and pioneer of scientific management.

== Biography ==
=== Early years ===
Walter Polakov was born in Luga, Russian Empire, and attended High School in Moscow before studying for a mechanical engineering degree at the Royal Institute of Technology Dresden in 1902. Returning to Moscow, he studied psychology and industrial hygiene before being employed at the Tula Locomotive Works, Moscow.

=== In the USA ===
In 1906 he emigrated with his family to the United States, where he was employed by the American Locomotive Company. There he met Henry Gantt, who was a consultant for the company at that time. Polakov joined Gantt's consulting company in 1910 and got to know Frederick Taylor, Frank Gilbreth and Harrington Emerson. However, by 1912 he was working for Wallace Clark before launching his own consulting company in 1915.

Polakov joined the Taylor Society at this time and supported a Marxist view of capitalism in their bulletin. He also joined the American Society of Mechanical Engineers (ASME) and was part of a faction led by Gantt that broke from the ASME conference to hold their own meeting of the New Machine, an organization which sought political as well as an economic power. About fifty people listened to Gantt's call for industrial reform and Polakov's analysis of inefficiency in the industrial context. Little came of their initiative despite lobbying Woodrow Wilson to give more power to managers. However, responding to the war needs of the US Navy, Gantt and Polakov were employed as consultants by the Emergency Fleet Corporation where Gantt finalized the development of his Gantt charts. Having helped the US shipbuilders keep up with losses due to German submarine action, the Gantt charts were then applied to managing fleet movements at the U. S. Shipping Board.

=== In the USSR ===
Polakov returned to his native Russia—by then the Soviet Union—in 1929, staying until 1931. Whilst there he worked for the Supreme Soviet of the National Economy to develop the First Five Year Plan. Here he introduced the Gantt chart, supplying Russian translations of explanations.

== Publications ==
- (1912) "Power Plant Betterment by Scientific Management", Engineering Magazine, (NY) Vol 41, pp. 101–12, 278–92, 448–56, 577–82, 798–809, 970–75
- (1916) "Discussion of Robert Valentine, The Progressive Relations Between Efficiency and Consent", Bulletin of Taylor Society, November, pp. 7–17
- (1921) Man and His Affairs from an Engineering Point of View Baltimore: Williams
- (1921) Mastering Power Production: The Industrial, Economic and Social Problems Involved and Their Solution New York: The Engineering Magazine Company
- (1921) "Making Work Fascinating" ASME Journal, December
- (1922) Polakov, Walter N. (1922), "Kinetic Statistics as an Aid to Production and Distribution", Journal of the American Statistical Association, 18 (139): 359–365, doi:10.2307/2276954, JSTOR 2276954
- (1931) "The Gantt Chart in Russia", American Machinist, 75, pp. 261–4
- (1933)The Power Age: Its Quest and Challenge New York: Covici Friede Publishers
