= William Loren Batt =

American mechanical engineer

- Born: July 31, 1885; Salem, Indiana
- Died: 1965 (aged 79–80)

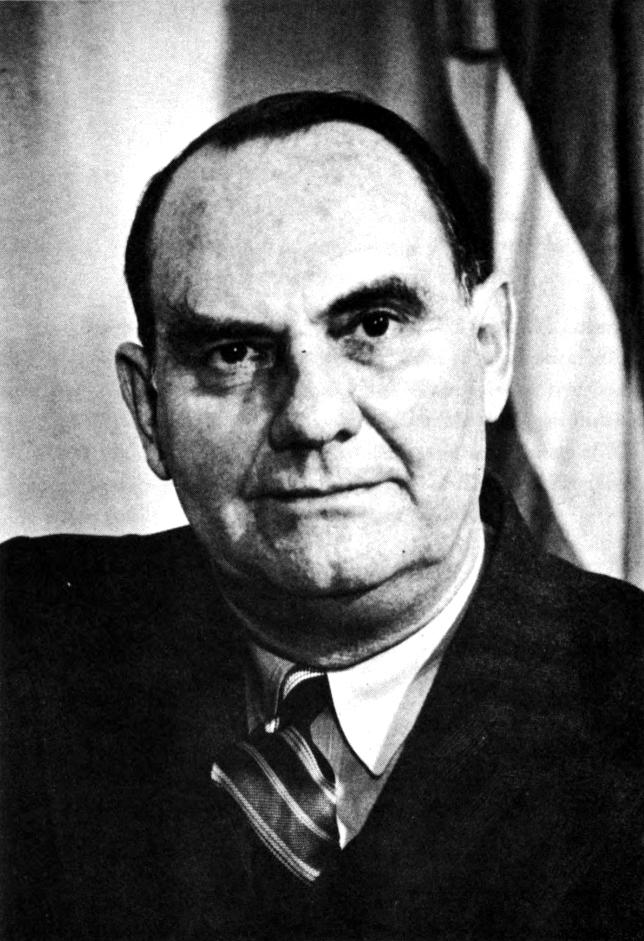
William Loren Batt, 1951

William Loren Batt (July 31, 1885 – 1965) was an American mechanical engineer, and president SKF Industries, Inc., awarded the Order of Vasa in 1923, the Henry Laurence Gantt Medal in 1940, and the Hoover Medal in 1951.

== Biography ==
Batt was born in Salem, Indiana in 1885 to George M. and Hettie M. Batt. His father was a roundhouse foreman by the Chicago, Indianapolis & Louisville Railroad, who kept moving for his job to New Albany, Indiana and finally to LaFayette. Batt received regular education in those places, a got acquainted with the machinist's trade in the railway's shops during vacations. He obtained his B.S. degree in mechanical engineering at the engineering school of Purdue University in 1907.

After engineering school Batt started as assistant in the private consulting practice of W.F. M. Goss, Dean of Engineering department. When Goss moved to the University of Illinois, Batt started as engineer in the Hess-Bright Manufacturing Company to do research into ball bearings in 1907. After three years of laboratory work, he coordinated the application of his findings in various fields. He was put in charge of the Railway Department a few years, was sales engineer in the Cleveland area, and in 1917 got promoted to general manager of the company.

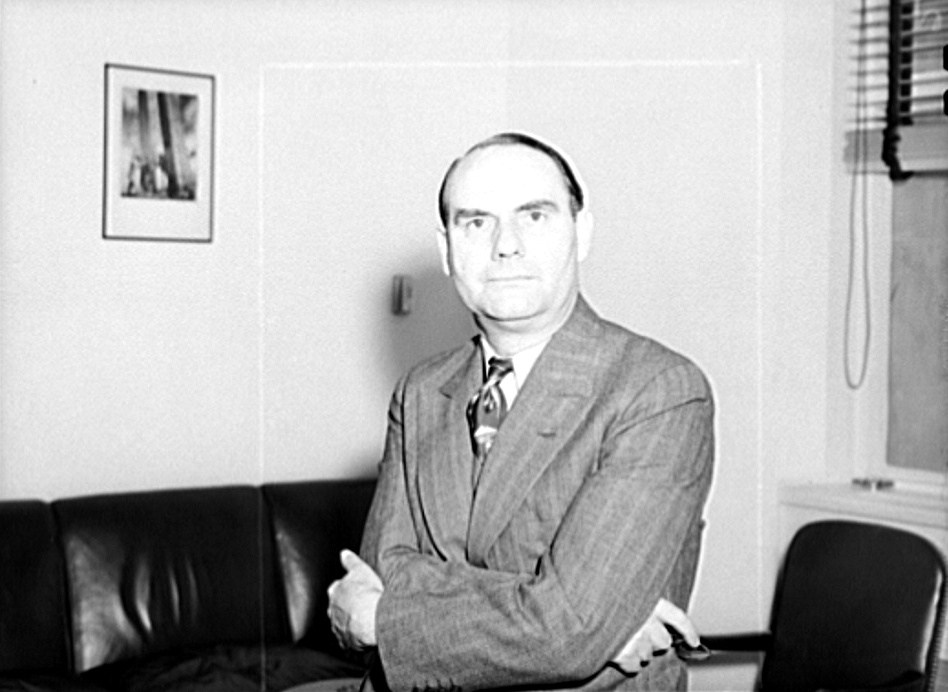
William L. Batt, Director 1940-46

In 1918 the company got bought by the Swedish SKF and merged into SKF Industries, Inc., where Batt was appointed vice-president, and in 1922 president of the company. In 1923 he was awarded the Order of Vasa by Gustaf V of Sweden. In the tear 1936 Batt was president of the American Society of Mechanical Engineers (ASME), and in 1940 he was awarded the Henry Laurence Gantt Medal by the American Management Association and the ASME.

During World War II Batt made a significant contribution to the management and planning of war production. He was made vice president of the War Production Board in joined the Combined Munitions Assignments Board in 1943 as member. For these efforts he was awarded the Hoover Medal in 1951.

== Publications ==
- William Loren Batt, The new deal: a people's capitalism. Business house, 1944.

Publications about William Loren Batt

- Hoover Medal Board of Award. William Loren Batt, thirteenth Hoover medalist. New York, 1951.
