= Frank Henry Neely =

American engineer (1884–1979)

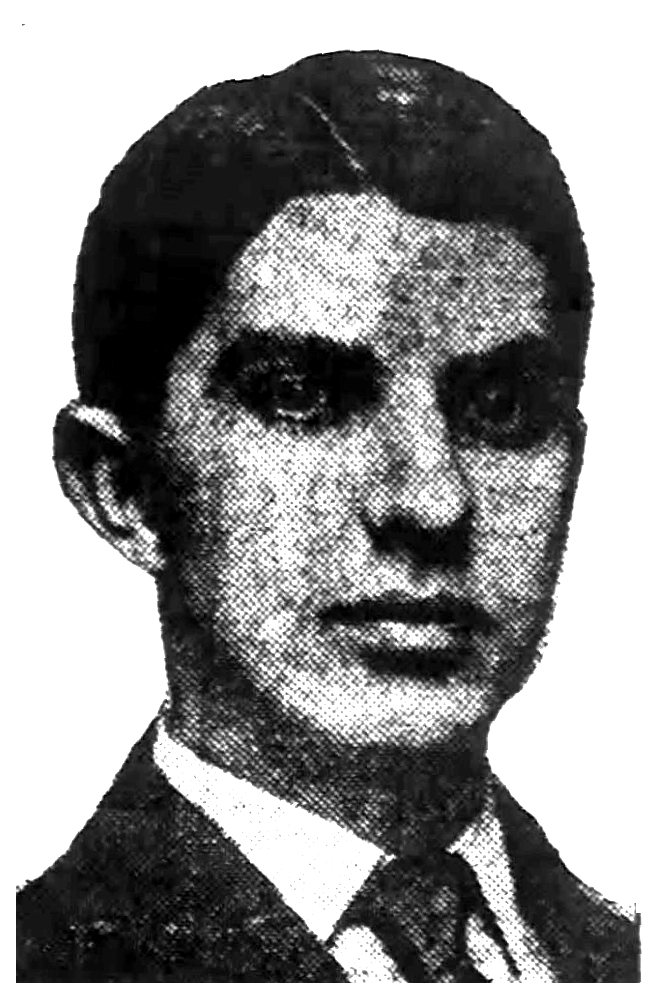
- Neely in 1904
- Born: January 19, 1884; Augusta, Georgia, US
- Died: May 24, 1979 (aged 95)
- Education: Georgia Tech (B.S.; mechanical engineering, 1904)
- Occupation: Engineer

Frank Henry Neely (January 19, 1884 – May 24, 1979) was an American mechanical engineer, consulting engineer, and President of Rich's Department Store in Atlanta. He is known for his civic activities in Atlanta, and as recipient of the Henry Laurence Gantt Medal in 1952.

== Biography ==
=== Early life and career ===
Born on January 19, 1884, in Augusta, Georgia to Benjamin Neely, the first superintendent of the schools of Rome, and Henrietta Eve Carmichael Neely, Neely obtained his B.S. in mechanical engineering at Georgia Tech in 1904.

Fulton Bag and Cotton Mills

After his graduation Neely started his career in industry at the Westinghouse Electric Corporation in Pittsburgh. From 1908 to 1915, he was independent consulting engineer in Atlanta, among others working for the Schlesinger Candy Factory run by his father-in-law Harry Lionel Schlesinger (1856–1920).

In 1915, Neely joined Fulton Bag and Cotton Mills where he was production manager in plants of the company in Atlanta, Dallas, New Orleans, St. Louis, New York, and Minneapolis.

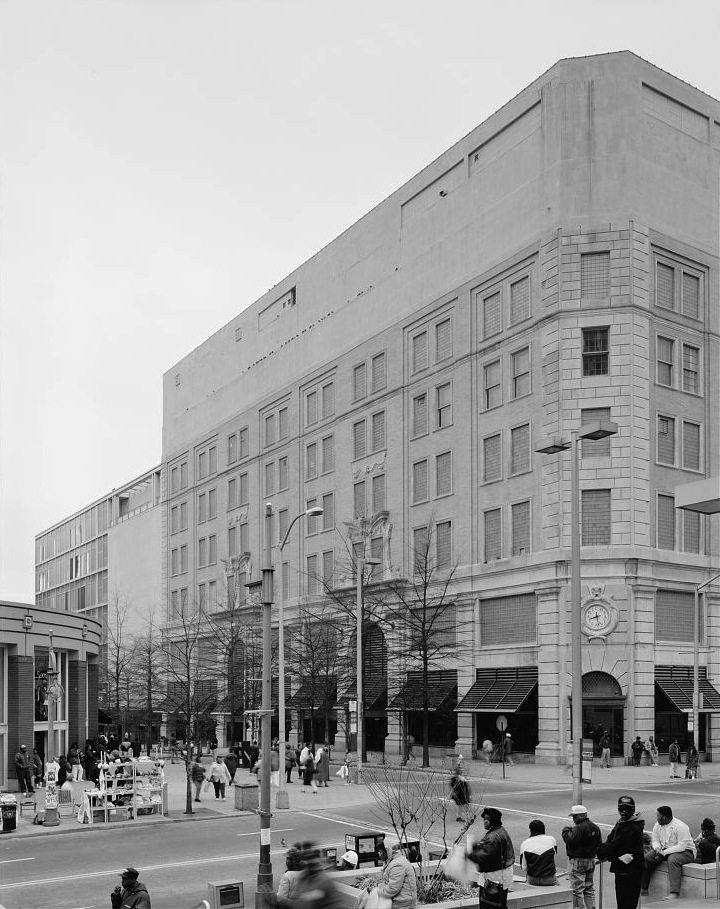
Rich's Downtown Department Store, Atlanta

In 1924, Neely became general manager in Rich's in Atlanta, where his friend Walter Rich was president. Here he spend the rest of his career climbing up the ladder to executive vice president and secretary, and eventually became president. Afterwards he served chairman of the board of trustees.

In his years at Rich's Neely "helped turn around the ailing department store. Most notable among his achievements was his dictum that the customer is always right, making the store famous for its liberal exchange policy."

=== Civic service ===
In his years in Atlanta Neely also participated in many of the local and regional civic activities. He was one of the founding members of the Atlanta Improvement Association, later Central Atlanta Progress, initiated the Special Relief Commission in 1931, and chaired Fulton the Community Chest at County Department of Public Welfare from 1931 to 1934. In World War II he directed the War Production Board in the region. Her he was "instrumental in bringing Bell Aircraft Corporation (now Lockheed Martin) to Atlanta".

After the war Neely was appointed first chair at Georgia State Department of Commerce in 1948, and chair of the Georgia Better Roads Committee in 1952. In 1953, in Washington he became "a member of the Committee on Business Organization of the Department of Defense and he later served as a member of Kennedy's White House Committee on Youth Employment".

In the 1930s, Neely had been named "Citizen of Atlanta". In 1941, he was awarded a Distinguished Service Award by Georgia Tech, and in 1952, the American Management Association and ASME awarded him the Henry Laurence Gantt Medal.

== Selected publications ==
- Frank Henry Neely. The engineer : how he may widen his avenues in public service. 1951.
- Frank Henry Neely. Rich's, a Southern institution since 1867, 1960.
- Neely, Frank Henry. The Manager, a Human Engineer. Atlanta, Privately Printed, 1965.
- Frank Henry Neely. Suggestions for committee participation in the study and solution of youth education and employment. 1962.
