= Alvin E. Dodd =

American consulting engineer

Alvin Earl Dodd (March 11, 1883 – June 2, 1951) was an American consulting engineer and president of the American Management Association, known as industry expert and recipient of the Henry Laurence Gantt Medal in 1944

== Biography ==
=== Youth and early career ===
Dodd was born in Grand Detour, Illinois as son of Alvin Harvey Dodd and Edith (Merrill) Dodd. After regular education, he studied engineering at the Armour Institute of Technology, nowadays Illinois Institute of Technology, where he obtained his BS in 1905.

After graduation Dodd in 1905 started his career as teacher of manual training in Allegheny, Pennsylvania. The next year he moved to the Normal School in North Adams, nowadays Massachusetts College of Liberal Arts, where he was appointed head of the manual arts department. Two years later he joined the North Bennet Street School, where he was principal until 1912. In 1907 Dodd had been elected president of the Eastern Arts Association, and around 1910 was appointed director of the National Society for the Promotion of Industrial Education. In those days he became acquainted with Woodrow Wilson at Princeton University, and visited him later in the White House.

=== World War I ===
In 1917 Dodd was appointed secretary of the Retail Research Association. In those days he also worked with Woodrow Wilson and Samuel Gompers on the Smith–Hughes Act, which "signalized the beginning of federal support of vocational education in agriculture, home economics, industry, and trade."

In a 1916 Address at the National Education Association of the United States, Dodd summarized that "the bill extends to the states the help of the government in establishing vocational education and in training persons to teach it. This is to be done by grants of money, and dy establishment of a Federal board of vocational education to work with and through the States in starting this form of education. The purpose of the proposed law is not to enable the Federal Government to enter the educational field and establish schools but rather to extend such aid as will stimulate the various states to develop the work themselves."

In 1917 Dodd joined the general Staff of the Army, where he took place in the Committee on Classification of Personal. Here he worked with James Rowland Angell, Beardsley Ruml and Walter Dill Scott to established "the Army's first program of personal management, testing of applicants, classification, and placement."

=== Interwar period and later ===
In 1917 Dodd was appointed president of the Retail Research Association, where he laid the basis of the first retail cooperative market research organization, later the Associated Merchandising Corporation.in 1921 he joined the Chamber of Commerce of the United States, where he managed its distribution department. In those days Dodd started lecturing in marketing, trade, distribution and industrial problems at Northwestern University, the University of Chicago, Stanford University, and the University of Washington.

In the later 1920s and 1930s Dodd served in several interim-management positions. He was director-general of the Wholesale Dry Goods Institute for two years, assistant to the president of Sears Roebuck for a year, and vice-president of Kroger Grocery and Baking Company in charge of merchandising for another few years. From 1936 to 1948 Dodd was president of the American Management Association, and since July 1, 1948, appointed honorary president.

== Publications ==
- Dodd, Alvin Earl, and James O'Neill Rice, eds. How to Train Workers for War Industries: A Manual of Tested Training Procedures. Harpers, 1942.
- Dodd, Alvin E. Packaging—A Job for Management. American Management Association, Marketing Series 36: 3-8.

Articles, a selection

- Dodd, Alvin E. "Vocational education and government aid." The Journal of Education 84.3 (2089 (1916): 77-77.
- Clark, F. E., Onthank, A. H., Dodd, A. E., Nystrom, P. H., Griffin, C. E., Lyon, L. S., & McGarry, E. D. (1926). "Reducing Costs of Marketing." The American Economic Review, 16(1), 250-265.

Publications about Alvin E. Dodd

- American Management Association, The Henry Laurence Gantt Memorial Gold Medal : Alvin E. Dodd, medalist. New York, 1944.
