= John Milton Hancock =

American Navy officer, interim-manager and Wall Street banker

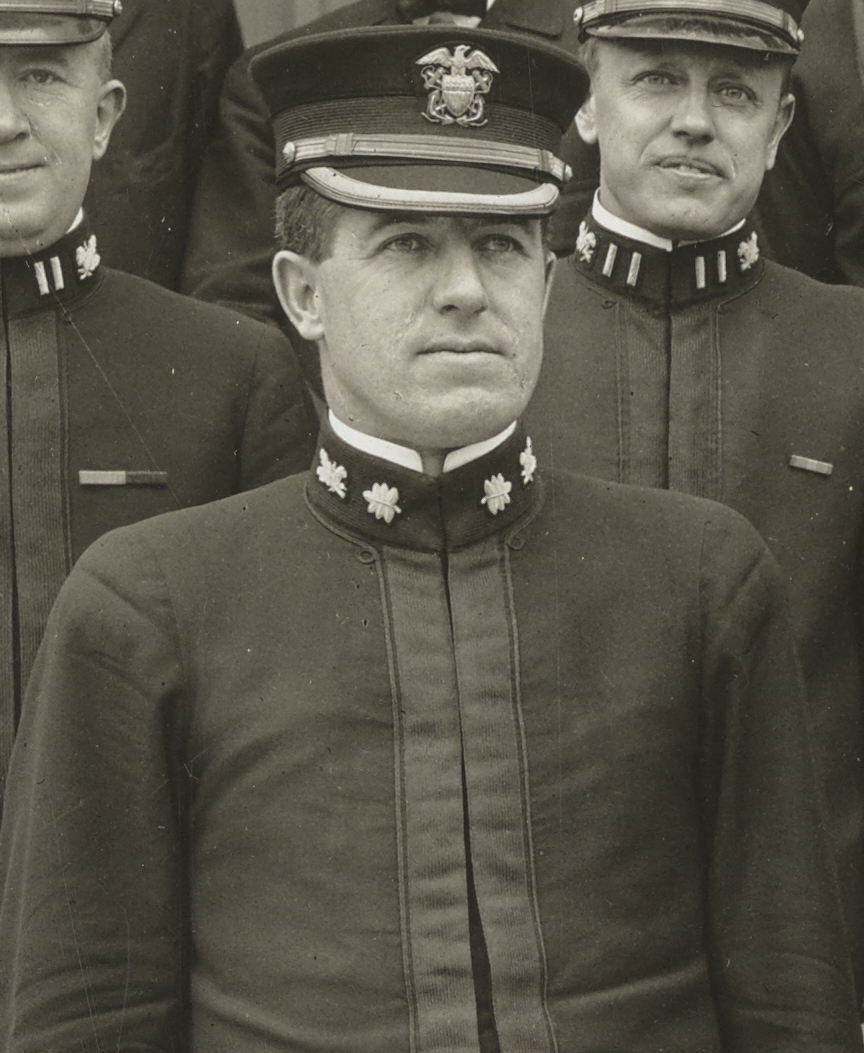
Hancock, c. 1917–1918

John Milton Hancock (February 2, 1883 – September 25, 1956) was an American Navy officer, interim-manager and Wall Street banker. He is known for distinguished achievement in industrial management in the private and public sector, for which he has been awarded the Henry Laurence Gantt Medal in 1944.

== Biography ==
=== Youth and education ===
Born in Emerado, North Dakota in 1883, Hancock was the son of Henry and Isabel (Irvine) Hancock. A 1950 newspaper article recalled, that "it was thirty below zero the February 2, 1883, that John Milton Hancock was born in Emerado... by the light of a kerosene lamp. If life in North Dakota lacked modern conveniences, it was also remarkably free of modern apprehensions."

Hancock's father originated from Canada, had set up a farm in North Dakota in 1878, and had founded the town of Emerado. In town he was also partner in the local hardware store and a realtor in the township. The family originated from Britain, and one of their forebears had been British drummer boy at the Battle of Waterloo.

In 1897 the family moved to Grand Forks, North Dakota, where after preparatory college Hancock attended the University of North Dakota obtaining his AB in 1903. At the University Hancock participated in the football team, until serious injuries forced him out of the game three years later. In those days he also participated in the newly founded literary society, and was editor-in-chief of The Student, the student magazine of the university.

=== Early career in the US navy ===
After a year as principal in a high school in Tower City, North Dakota, Hancock enlisted in the US Navy in 1904. He joined Bureau of Supplies and Accounts, and started as storekeeper in Olongapo Naval Station in the Philippines, now the U.S. Naval Base Subic Bay, and out on the see with the USS Galveston. In the last five years before World War I Hancock served Navy yards back in the States in Boston, Philadelphia, and Puget Sound, and returned to the Philippines to the Naval Base Cavite. he was on the Wilmington-class gunboat USS Helena on the Yangtze River in China, when war broke loose.

In 1914 Hancock was appointed head of the US Navy Bureau of Supplies and Accounts, and was promoted to the rank of lieutenant commander in 1916, and commander in 1918. The University of North Dakota (2017) recalled that "ss head of the purchasing division, Hancock made purchases of Navy supplies in excess of $2 million per day. He designed a system based on commodity sections: estimates were made to reflect as closely as possible the Navy’s material needs, and contact was maintained with the country’s industries. The Navy's newly legalized authority to award contracts based on profitability prompted the War Industries Board to form a price-fixing committee, of which Hancock was a member. From April to August 1917, he served on the General Munitions Board, and in 1919 accompanied Franklin D. Roosevelt, then Assistant Secretary of the Navy, to dispose of accumulated naval equipment overseas. Hancock also established organizations to settle claims against the Navy."

=== Private sector and back in Washington ===
After World War I Hancock moved to the private sector to join the Lehman Brothers in New York City, where he came into prominence. His first assignment was the reorganization of the Jewel Tea Company in Chicago, Illinois, nowadays part of Jewel (supermarket). Again the University of North Dakota (2017), recalled that the "Jewel Tea Company, Chicago, Illinois... had been financed by them and was now deep in debt. The company had been operating at an annual loss of $2 million, along with a substantial debt of $4.5 million. Hancock came on board as vice-president and under his watch implemented corrective strategies: unprofitable branches were closed, low-volume routes were dropped, inventories were substantially reduced to provide badly needed cash, common dividends were canceled, and preferred dividends were deferred. After these changes were implemented, the result was a complete turnaround for the company. By 1924, the company's annual profit was $750,000."

In 1922 Hancock had been appointed assigned president of the Jewel Tea Company, and in 1924 he became partner in Lehman Brothers, a milestone since he was the first partner not to be a Lehman family member. In the next decennia Hancock was interim-director in more company's such as Sears, Cluett Peabody & Company, Brunswick Corporation, and Kroger. In the 1930s he also got into civil affairs.

Hancock was also involved in civil affairs again. He was executive officer in the National Recovery Administration in 1933, member of the War Production Board in 1939, and assistant director in the Office of War Mobilization in 1943 appointed by President Franklin D. Roosevelt. In 1942 he had done a government survey of the rubber industry with Bernard Baruch, and in 1946 again joined him as general manager of the U.S. Delegation to the United Nations Atomic Energy Commission. He also served two terms as mayor of Scarsdale, New York (1935–1937).

Hancock died at White Plains Hospital on September 25, 1956 and was interred at Kensico Cemetery.

== Reception ==
One of Hancock's most remarkable accomplishments was reported in Time (magazine) in 1944:

"For about 18 months the Army, Navy and other war procurement agencies have quick-fingered a hot potato that never grew cool. The problem: How could U.S. war contracts be ended uniformly and quickly so that the industrial plant could speedily shift from one war product to another and reconvert without waste motion at the war's end?
When a solution seemed finally impossible, the hot potato was tossed over to Elder Statesman Bernie Baruch and his assistant, ex-Wall Street Banker John Milton Hancock. The two cooled it off in just two months and two days. Then the Baruch-Hancock combination presented Home Front Czar James F. Byrnes with a contract-cancellation clause, ready-made to fit almost all fixed-fee contracts. Promptly Czar Jimmy ordered it put into effect..."

In recognition of his achievements, Hancock received Navy Cross in 1919, the Henry Laurence Gantt Medal in 1945 by the American Management Association and the ASME, and the US Army Medal of Merit in 1948. In 1950 the Hamilton College in New York, and the New York University both granted him honorary degrees.

== Publications ==
- Bernard Baruch, John M. Hancock. Report on war and post-war adjustment policies. February 15, 1944. Washington : U.S. Govt. Print. Off., 1944.

Articles, a selection

- Hancock, John M. "There must be no veto on atomic bombs." New York Times Magazine (New York) Dec. 15, 1946: 54-56.

Publications about John Milton Hancock

- American Management Association, The Henry Laurence Gantt Memorial Gold Medal: John Milton Hancock, medalist, 1945.
- American Institute of Management. "John Milton Hancock," in: National Biographic, Volume 1, 1953.
- Mr. Hancock and the Bomb; A Camera exploration of Chicago, Fortune, February 1947.
- Frank J. Allston. "Lieutenant Commander John Milton Hancock, PC, USN," in: Ready for Sea: The Bicentennial History of the U.S. Navy Supply Corps, 1995, p. 178.
