= Thomas Roy Jones =

American industrialist and management author

Thomas Roy Jones (April 26, 1890 - June 21, 1985) was an American industrialist and management author, known as business school graduate, company president, and recipient of the Henry Laurence Gantt Medal in 1951.

== Life and work ==
Jones was born in Kingman, Kansas in 1890 to Joseph Francis Jones and Emma Laura (Miller) Jones. He obtained his BSc at the University of Kansas in 1913, and obtained a postgraduate degree from Harvard Business School in 1917.

Jones started his career in industry as works manager of the motor works of the Moline Plow Company, was assistant general manager at the Cincinnati Milling Machine Company, and was vice-president and general manager at the Harris Seybold Potter Company at Cleveland. in 1932-33 he joined the American Type Founders as general manager, and vice-president of its sales corporation.

Next Jones became chairman and chief executive officer of Daystrom Company, a management holding company that owned five different companies: American Type Founders, Daystrom Furniture, Daystrom Electric, Daystrom Laminates and Daystrom Instruments Division. In 1954 Daystrom bought Heath Company and was in 1962 absorbed by oilfield service company Schlumberger Ltd. Shortly afterwards, in 1963, Jones retired. In these days Jones had also served as president of the National Association of Manufacturers.

From 1953 to 1970, Jones was a member of the board of trustees of Lafayette College.

In 1951 the American Management Association and ASME had awarded Jones the annual Henry Laurence Gantt Medal. Jones died at his home in Carmel-by-the-Sea, California in 1985 at the age of 95.

== Selected publications ==
- Jones, Thomas Roy. Production and Inventory Budgets. American Management Association, 1928.
- Thomas R. Jones. Theories and types of organization, their history, industrial and economic background, and trend. The Cincinnati Milling Machine Company Production Executives' Series: No. 83 Copyright, 1929
- Jones, Thomas Roy. Printing in America and American type founders. Newcomen Society of England, American Branch, 1948

Articles, a selection

- Thomas Roy Jones, "Can Management Sell Ideas As Well as Profits." Advanced Management, 15 (Feb. 1950): 19-21;
