= Julie England =

American chemical engineer

Julie Spicer England (born November 12, 1957) is an American chemical engineer and business executive, who served as Vice President of Texas Instruments Incorporated.

Born in Wisconsin Rapids, Wisconsin, England obtained her BA in Chemical Engineering in 1979 and later her MBA, both from the Texas Tech University. After her graduation she started her lifelong career at Texas Instruments Incorporated. In 1998 she was inducted into the Women in Technology International Hall of Fame (WITI), and in 2004 was awarded the Henry Laurence Gantt Medal.

== Selected publications ==
- England, Julie Spicer, "Applications of Automated Test and Novel, Small Sample Size Statistics in FPA Production," for presentation to IRIS Specialty Group on IR Detectors, Aug. 13–16. IRIS Specialty Group on Infrared Detectors, Aug. 12–16. in: Texas Instruments Technical Journal. Volume 8. 1991. p. 148
