= Spur (disambiguation) =

A spur is a metal instrument fastened to the heel of a horse rider.

Spur or Spurs may also refer to:

== Arts and media ==
- Spur (architecture), the ornament carved on the angles of the bases of early columns
- "Spurs" (short story), by Tod Robbins; served as the basis of the film Freaks
- Spur (typography), a small continuation of part of a printed letter, especially an uppercase G
- Spur Award, an annual literary prize awarded by the Western Writers of America
- The Spurs, a Canadian country music group 1999–2000
- Gruppe SPUR, a German artistic collaboration, and their journal of the same name

== Organizations ==
- San Francisco Bay Area Planning and Urban Research Association, a non-profit research, education, and advocacy organization
- Gruppe SPUR, a German artistic collaboration, and their journal of the same name
- Spur Steak Ranches, a chain of steakhouses in South Africa
- SPURS National Honor Society, a collegiate sophomore honor-service society in the US
- Spur gas, North American gas stations operated by Murphy Oil

== Places ==
- Spur (lunar crater)
- Spur, Texas, US
- Spur Gasoline Station, a historic building in Cynthiana, Kentucky, US
- The Spur, a collection of Arts and Crafts bungalows in Clifton, Christchurch, New Zealand

== Science and technology ==
=== Biology and medicine ===
- Spur (botany), an elongated appendage of certain sepals
- Spur (stem), a short flower- and fruit-bearing stem on some fruit trees
- Spur (zoology), an outgrowth of bone covered in a sheath of horn
- Bone spurs, a skeletal disorder forming small bony outgrowth along joint margins
  - Heel spur, a thin spike of calcification in the human foot

=== Geology and Earth science ===
- Spur (geology), a ridge, often one that is subordinate to a larger ridge
  - Interlocking spur, one of any number of ridges extending alternately from the opposite sides of the wall of a young, V-shaped valley
- Spur (lunar crater)
- Spur (topography), a mountain ridge projecting laterally from a main mountain or mountain range
- Truncated spur, a ridge that ends in an inverted-V face and was produced by the erosion

=== Other uses in science and technology ===
- Spur (chemistry), a region of high concentration of reaction product
- Spur gear, a type of gear
- Spurious tone or spur, a tone in an electronic circuit which interferes with a signal

== Sports ==
- Tottenham Hotspur F.C., a football team based in Tottenham, north London, England
- San Antonio Spurs, a National Basketball Association team based in San Antonio, Texas, US
  - Spurs Sports & Entertainment, the company that owns the San Antonio Spurs and other sports-related assets
- Cape Town Spurs F.C., a football team based in Cape Town, South Africa
- Witbank Spurs, a defunct association football club that was based in Witbank, South Africa
- Chancellor's Spurs, a traveling trophy awarded to the winner of the college football game between Texas Tech University and the University of Texas at Austin

== Types of route ==
- Spur line, a short railway (railroad) branching from a main line
- Spur route, a short road branching from longer, more important route
- Spur trail, a shorter trail which branches from a longer route

== Other uses ==
- Spur (horse), an American thoroughbred racehorse
- Spur (typography), a small continuation of part of a printed letter, especially an uppercase G
- Spur (vine), one-year-old wood of a grapevine that is pruned back to leave just one or two buds to be used for next year's crop of grapes

== See also ==
- Spurr (disambiguation)
- Spurt (disambiguation)
