= Willard Rockwell =

American businessman (1888–1978)

- Born: March 30, 1888; Boston, Massachusetts, U.S.
- Died: October 16, 1978 (aged 90); Pittsburgh, Pennsylvania, U.S.
- Resting place: Homewood Cemetery, Pittsburgh
- Education: Massachusetts Institute of Technology
- Occupations: Business executive, Engineer
- Known for: Founder of Rockwell International
- Political party: Republican
- Spouse: Clara Whitcomb Thayer
- Children: 5
- Awards: Henry Laurence Gantt Medal (1974), Golden Plate Award of the American Academy of Achievement (1972)

Willard Frederick Rockwell, Sr. (March 31, 1888 – October 16, 1978) was an American engineer businessman who helped shape and name what eventually became the Rockwell International company. He created and directed a number of major corporations with a wide range of products for the automobile and aviation and related industries. By the 1970s, he was a leading figure in American defense industries. "If it moves, we probably made something on it," was his boast.

== Early life and career ==
Rockwell was born in Boston, Massachusetts, where his father was a contractor. He attended public schools before attending the Massachusetts Institute of Technology for three years. In 1909-1915 he was the chief engineer for several small companies. In 1915, he moved to Cleveland, Ohio, becoming manager of a company making axles for automobiles and trucks. During World War I, he was a civilian specialist in the Motor Transport Division of the Army Quartermaster Corps. In 1919, he started his first company in Oshkosh, Wisconsin. He sold it to the Timken-Detroit Axle Company in 1928, staying on as its manager, and also a director of Timken. He became president of Timken in 1933-1940, and chairman of the board 1940-1953. During World War II, it produced 80 percent of the axles for large army trucks, and 75 percent of the armor plate for tanks.

Simultaneously he was president of several smaller companies. By 1947, his combined enterprises had 5,000 employees in 15 plants, with sales of over $62 million. He merged them into Timken in 1953 to form the Rockwell Spring and Axle Company, of which he was chairman of the board. In 1958, his conglomerate was renamed the Rockwell Standard Corporation, and became one of the largest suppliers of parts to the automobile and truck industry. It produced a wide variety of automobile parts, such as transmissions, gears, springs, bumpers, and especially axles for trucks, buses, streetcars, tractors and other motorized vehicles. Rockwell was always an engineer at heart; He received several patents, such as one in 1926 for an "improved double reduction and reversing differential axle construction especially useful for bus axles."

Rockwell became interested in aviation after the war, and produced a wide variety of engine parts, as well as a small executive aircraft. Expanding beyond transportation, his companies made meters for the gas and water industries. He also made power tools, valves, taxi meters, and parking meters. For example, the Pittsburgh Equitable Meter and Manufacturing Company was a conglomerate, comprising many companies that manufactured items ranging from water meters to ball bearings. This company became one of the largest meter production facilities in the world. By 1958, he and his son purchased Aero Design & Engineering Co.

The company became a major player in the space race of the 1960s. In 1967 Rockwell-Standard merged with North American Aviation, becoming North American-Rockwell. It was renamed Rockwell International in 1973 and became the prime contractor on the Space Shuttle. Sales reached $6.3 billion in 1979, ranking it number 11 in defense contracts, in addition to its major presence in commercial aircraft, electronics, automotive components. Rockwell stepped down that same year.

Numerous major corporations brought Rockwell onto their boards, including banks, insurance companies, and railroads.

== Family ==
Rockwell came from a Yankee family and married Clara Thayer, a descendant of John Alden who arrived aboard the Mayflower in 1620. The couple had five children, Kay, Janet, Willard Jr., Eleanor, and Betty. He was a Baptist and Republican. He brought his son Willard Frederick "Al" Rockwell, Jr. (1914-1992) into the network of family businesses in 1947. Rockwell Jr. became a senior executive for several of them before taking over in the mid-1960s, leading work on the NASA Apollo and Space Shuttle programs until his 1989 retirement. Willard Sr. also brought his brother Walter F. Rockwell (1899-1973) into the family business, making him president of Timken-Detroit Axle 1933 to 1953, as well as other roles.

Rockwell died on October 16, 1978. He was survived by three daughters.
