= Rockwell International =

American manufacturing conglomerate (1919–2001)

- Formerly: Rockwell Manufacturing Company (1919–1968) North American Rockwell (1968-1973)
- Industry: Conglomerate
- Founded: 1919; 107 years ago
- Founder: Willard Rockwell
- Defunct: 2001; 25 years ago
- Fate: Split into several companies
- Successors: Boeing Integrated Defense Systems; BTR plc; Conexant Systems; Meritor; Rockwell Automation; Rockwell Collins
- Headquarters: (Until 1988) Pittsburgh, Pennsylvania (1988–1991) El Segundo, California (1991–1997) Seal Beach, California (1997–1999) Costa Mesa, California (1999–2001) Milwaukee, Wisconsin

Rockwell International was a major American manufacturing conglomerate. It was involved in aircraft, the space industry, defense and commercial electronics, components in the automotive industry, printing presses, avionics and industrial products. At its peak, Rockwell International was No. 27 on the Fortune 500 list, with assets of over $8 billion, sales of $27 billion and 115,000 employees.

Rockwell International's predecessor was Rockwell Manufacturing Company, founded in 1919 by Willard Rockwell. In 1968, Rockwell Manufacturing Company included seven operating divisions manufacturing industrial valves, German 2-cycle motors, power tools, gas and water meters. In 1973, it was combined with the aerospace products of North American Rockwell and renamed Rockwell International. It was later rebranded to Rockwell in early 1995, before being split into Rockwell Collins and Rockwell Automation in 2001.

== History ==
=== Rockwell Manufacturing Company ===
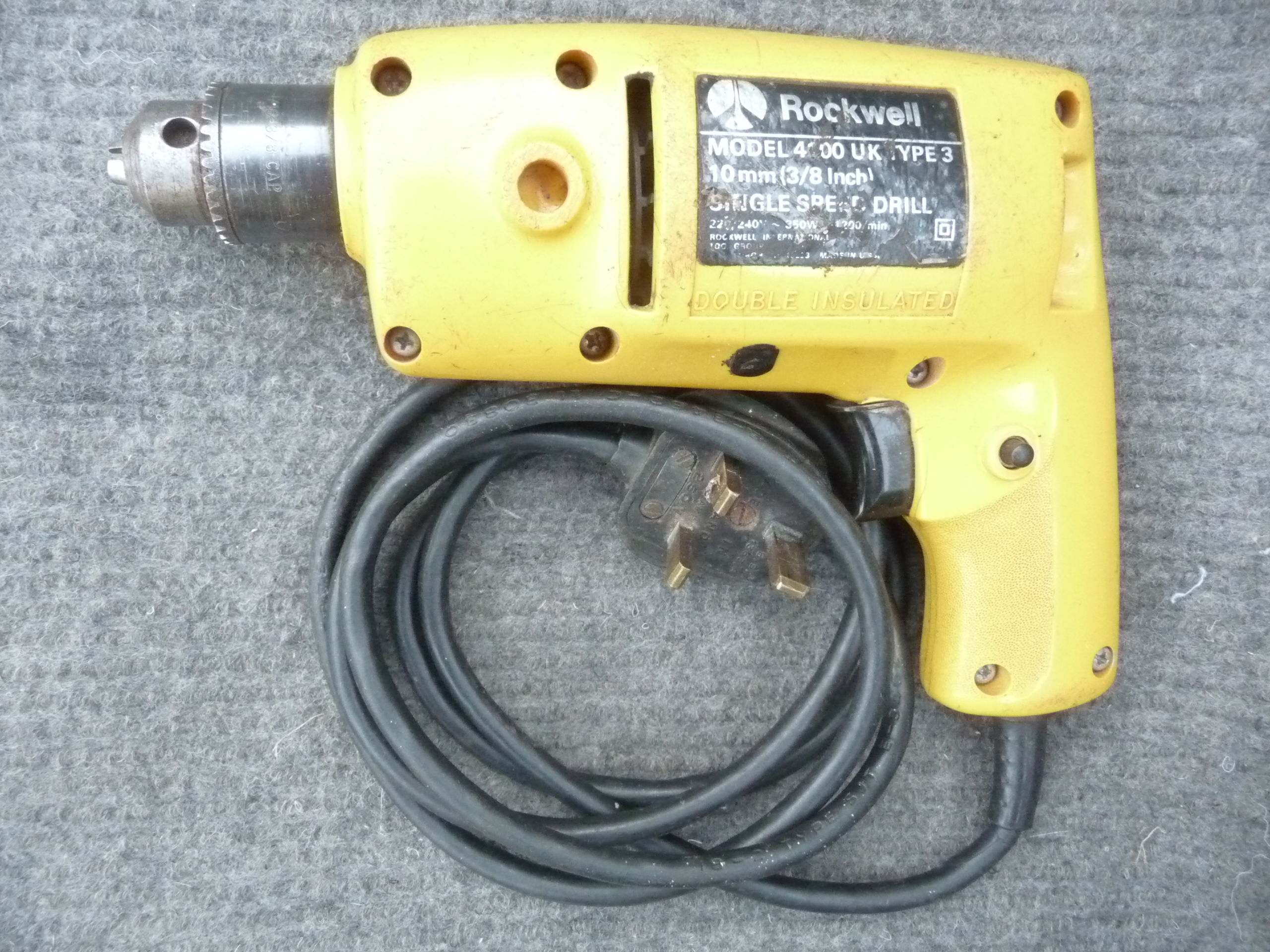
Rockwell Model 4000 single speed electric drill circa 1980 fitted with UK-standard BS1363 plug-top

Boston-born Willard Rockwell (1888–1978) made his fortune with the invention and successful launch of a new bearing system for truck axles in 1919. He merged his Oshkosh, Wisconsin–based operation with the Timken-Detroit Axle Company (current Meritor Inc.) in 1928, rising to become chairman of its board in 1940.

Rockwell also drew on the strengths of several of George Westinghouse's concerns, and Westinghouse is considered a co-founder of the company.

In 1945, Rockwell Manufacturing Company acquired Delta Machinery and renamed it the Delta Power Tool Division of Rockwell Manufacturing Company and continued to manufacture in Milwaukee. In 1966, Rockwell invented the world's first power miter saw. In 1981, Rockwell's power tool group was acquired by Pentair and re-branded Delta Machinery. Pentair's Tools group was acquired by Black & Decker in 2005. Since 2011, Delta has been a subsidiary of Chang Type Industrial Co., Ltd. of China.

In 1956, Rockwell Manufacturing Co. bought Walker-Turner from Kearney and Trecker. In 1957, Walker-Turner operations were closed down in Plainfield, New Jersey, and moved to Bellefontaine, Ohio, and Tupelo, Mississippi.

Timken-Detroit merged in 1953 with the Standard Steel Spring Company, forming the Rockwell Spring and Axle Company. After various mergers with automotive suppliers, it comprised about 10 to 20 factories in the Upper Midwestern U.S. and southern Ontario, and in 1958 renamed itself Rockwell-Standard Corporation.

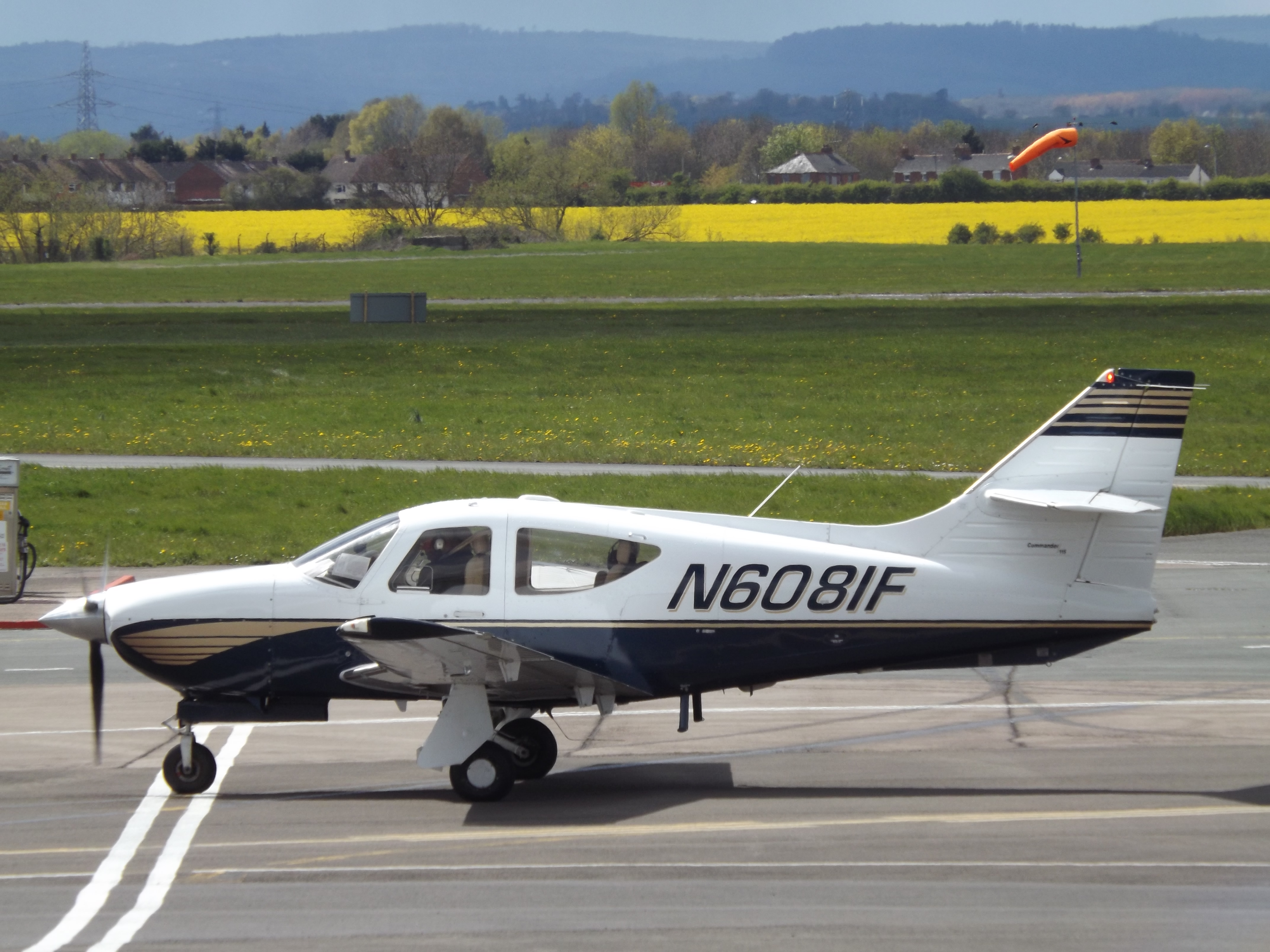
Rockwell Commander 114

Pittsburgh-based Rockwell-Standard Corp. then acquired and merged with Los Angeles–based North American Aviation to form North American Rockwell in September 1967. It then purchased Miehle-Goss-Dexter, the largest supplier of printing presses, and in 1973, acquired Collins Radio, a major avionics supplier.

In 1968, Sterling Faucet Company was bought by Rockwell Manufacturing Co. and it became a subsidiary of the company.

=== 1968–1974 ===
Michael W. Hodges (who had also served as Corporate Director Manufacturing and later as CEO and 'Geschäftsführer' (managing director) of the German-based Engine Division) joined Rockwell Manufacturing Company in 1968 as Corporate Director Quality Assurance. He was appointed member of the Board of Directors of Rockwell GmbH Germany and Dikkers Valve Products LLC Netherlands. Prior to Rockwell, Michael Hodges was a physicist with NASA and aerospace management with Martin-Marietta Corp. in Orlando, Florida.

During Hodges' seven years with Rockwell there were approximately 90,000 employees in seven divisions: the Valve Division with products for the gas and oil industry with plants located in Barberton, Ohio, Raleigh, North Carolina, Sulphur Springs, Texas, and Kearney, Nebraska, the Gas Products Division of meters and regulators in Dubois, Pennsylvania, the Municipal Water Meter Division in Uniontown, Pennsylvania, the Power Tool Division in Syracuse, New York, Jackson, Tennessee, Tupelo, Mississippi, and Columbia, South Carolina, the Transportation Division in Atchison, Kansas, with a large steel foundry of products for the automotive, railway and rapid-transit industry, the Sterling Faucet Division in Reedsville, West Virginia, and the Engine Division in Pinneberg, Germany (previously ILO-Motorenwerke, founded 1911 and acquired by Rockwell in 1959), manufacturing 2-cycle gas-driven motors for developing nation products including motor tillers, water pumps, sprayers, cement mixers, tampers and mopeds as well as snowmobile and all-terrain vehicle engines for North America.

A significantly different direction was planned starting in 1973 away from the business model developed since 1945 by the founder Willard Rockwell (1888–1978). The founder's son, Willard Rockwell Jr., appeared taking the company in a new direction, replacing the founder's model of strong medium-size manufacturing companies with diverse industrial products with strong industrial engineering and quality control in multiple locations – to a new model leveraging assets of the profitable seven manufacturing divisions of Rockwell Manufacturing Company into a new business model of a dominant government-serving (NASA, Defense Dept.) aerospace company, named Rockwell International, which included North American Aviation, of products such as the Space Shuttle. By the end of the 1980s, Rockwell International began to sell-off its prior industrial product manufacturing divisions, starting with the Valve Division, leading to the sale of all divisions and the end of the Rockwell names > Rockwell Manufacturing Company, North American Rockwell, and Rockwell International.

=== Apex and break-up ===
In 1978, Rockwell released AIM-65, a one board microprocessor development board based on the MOS Technology 6502. With the death of company founder and first CEO Willard F. Rockwell in 1978, and the stepping down of his son Willard Rockwell Jr. in 1979 as the second CEO, Bob Anderson became CEO and led the company through the 1980s when it became the largest U.S. defense contractor and largest NASA contractor. Rockwell acquired the privately held Allen-Bradley Company for US$1.6 billion (roughly $4.8 billion today) in February 1985, of which $1 billion ($3 billion today) was cash, and became a producer of industrial automation hardware and software.

During the 1980s, Anderson, his CFO Bob dePalma, and the Rockwell management team built the company to #27 on the Fortune 500 list. It boasted sales of US$12 billion (roughly $29.6 billion today), and assets of over $8 billion ($19.7 billion today). Its workforce of over 115,000 was organized into nine major divisions: Space, Aircraft, Defense Electronics, Commercial Electronics, Light Duty Automotive Components, Heavy Duty Automotive Components, Printing Presses, Valves and Meters, and Industrial Automation. Rockwell International was a major employer in southern California, northern Ohio, northern Georgia, eastern Oklahoma, Michigan, western Texas, Iowa, Illinois, Wisconsin and western Pennsylvania.

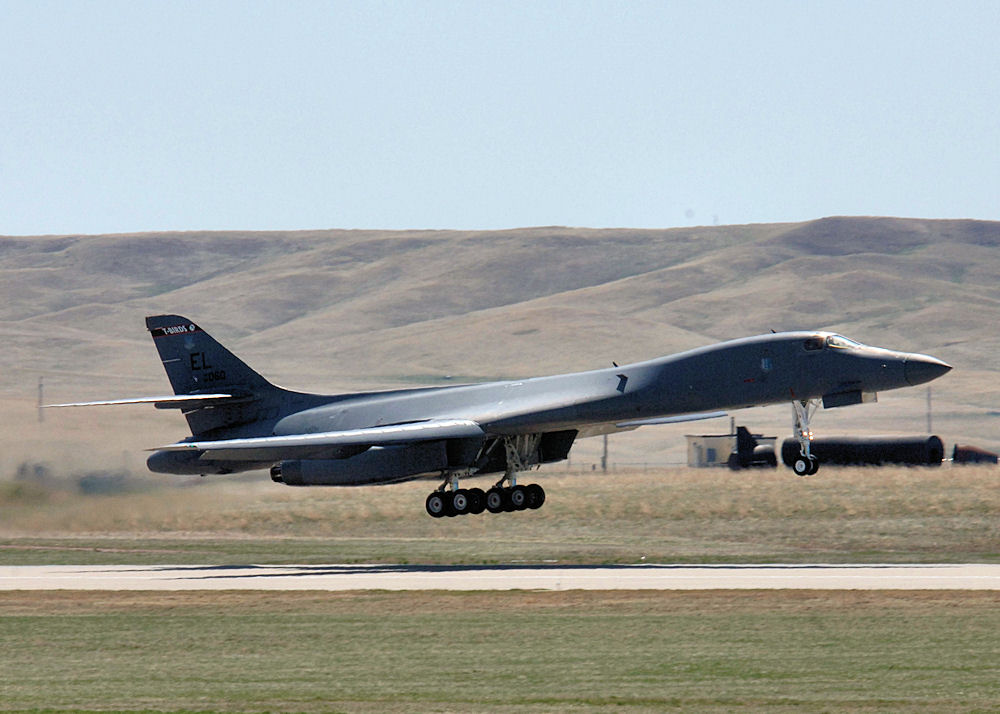
Rockwell B-1 Lancer

Anderson stepped down as CEO in February 1988, leaving the company to president Donald R. Beall. Beall had sought to convert Rockwell International into an electronics company, due to the shifting corporate landscape of the 90's, as well as declining revenues due to the completion of the Space Shuttle program and the completion of the B-1 bomber program. From 1988 to 2001 the company moved its headquarters four times: from Pittsburgh, Pennsylvania, where it had been for decades to El Segundo, California, to Seal Beach, California, to Costa Mesa, California, to Milwaukee, Wisconsin.

At the end of the 1980s, the company sold its valve and meter division, formerly Rockwell Manufacturing, to British Tyre & Rubber. In early 1995, Rockwell International had rebranded itself to Rockwell, along with rebranding several divisions as part of the company's overall shift towards electronics. As part of this, Rockwell also sold off Rockwell Aerospace, which included what was once North American Aviation, the Defense Electronics Division and Rocketdyne, to Boeing in December 1996. In Janurary of 1999, the company spun off its semiconductor products as Conexant Technologies (CNXT), later bought by Synaptics in 2017. Rockwell also spun off its two automotive divisions (light vehicles division and heavy vehicles division) as one publicly traded company, Meritor Automotive, based in Troy, Michigan, which then merged with Arvin Industries to form Arvin Meritor. In 1996, Rockwell sold Graphic Systems (formerly Miehle-Goss-Dexter), an Illinois-based newspaper and commercial printing press manufacturer, to its internal management team Stonington Partners as part of a new corporation for US$600 million.

In 2001, what remained of Rockwell was split into two publicly traded companies, Rockwell Automation and Rockwell Collins, ending the run of what had once been a massive and diverse conglomerate. The split was structured so that Rockwell Automation was the legal successor of the old Rockwell International, while Rockwell Collins was the spin-off.

The various Rockwell companies list a large number of technological firsts and historic developments in their histories, including the World War II-era P-51 Mustang fighter and B-25 Mitchell bomber, the Korean War-era F-86 Sabre fighter jet, America's first truly supersonic fighter, the F-100 Super Sabre, and the B-1 Lancer bomber, as well as the Apollo spacecraft, the Space Shuttle orbiter, and most of the Navstar Global Positioning System satellites.

Rocketdyne, which had been spun off by North American in 1955, was re-merged into Rockwell, and by that time produced most of the rocket engines used in the United States. Rockwell also purchased the Aero Design and Engineering Company from William and Rufus Travis Amis. Rockwell redesigned the company's Aero Commander aircraft, introducing its new design as the Rockwell Commander 112 and Commander 114.

The company developed a desktop calculator based on a MOSFET chip for use by its engineers. In 1967 Rockwell set up its own manufacturing plant to produce them, starting North American Rockwell MicroElectronics Corp. (called NARMEC). This would later become Rockwell Semiconductor. One of its major successes came in the early 1990s when it introduced the first low-cost 14.4 kbit/s modem chipset, which was used in a huge number of modems.

Collins radios were fitted to 80% of the airliners which were based in first-world countries. Collins designed and built the radios that communicated the Apollo Moon landings and the high-frequency radio network that allows worldwide communication with U.S. military aircraft. Rockwell's Rocketdyne division designed and built the third stage of the Minuteman intercontinental ballistic missile, and the Advanced Inertial Reference Sphere inertial navigation system that provided its navigation. It also built inertial navigation systems for the fleet of ballistic missile submarines.

In addition to the manufacture of nuclear missiles and bombers, Rockwell also produced key components of the bombs they carried, including plutonium triggers at the Rocky Flats Plant on a rural site northwest of Denver, Colorado. Rockwell ran the weapons plant from 1975 to 1990, and was one of the subjects of the investigation of Special Grand Jury 89-2 into mismanagement of the plant. In 1990, a group of nearby homeowners filed a lawsuit against Rockwell and Dow Chemical Company, the plant's original operator, accusing them of reducing the value of their properties as a result of plutonium releases from the plant. A $375 million settlement was reached in 2016.

Rockwell built heavy-duty truck axles and drive-trains in the U.S., along with power windows, seats, and locks. The Rockwell Tripmaster trip recording system for commercial vehicles was released along with the Logtrak module for DOT log recording for fleets who successfully petitioned the DOT for paper logbook exemptions. Rockwell also built yachts and business jets and owned large amounts of real estate.

It was also involved in providing custom electronic intelligence equipment to the Imperial Iranian Air Force as part of Project Ibex and paid bribes to the Shah of Iran in order to secure contracts there.

== Products ==
=== Aircraft ===
- Fuji/Rockwell Commander 700
- North American Rockwell OV-10 Bronco
- North American Sabreliner
- Rockwell B-1 Lancer
- Rockwell Commander 112
- Rockwell Ranger 2000
- Rockwell X-30
- Rockwell XFV-12
- Rockwell-MBB X-31

=== Crewed spacecraft ===
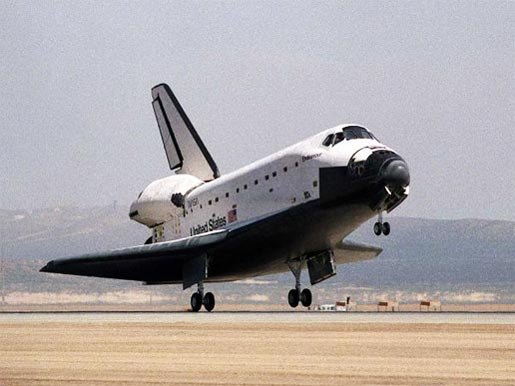
Space Shuttle orbiter Endeavour

- Apollo Command and Service Module (initially under North American Aviation, then North American Rockwell)
- Space Shuttle orbiter (initially under North American Rockwell)

=== Rocket propulsion (Rocketdyne division) ===
- H-1 (Saturn I, I-B)
- J-2 (Saturn I-B, V)
- F-1 (Saturn V)
- RS-25 (Space Shuttle)

For a more extensive list, see Rocketdyne engines.

=== Missiles ===
- AGM-53 Condor
- AGM-114 Hellfire

=== Unmanned aerial vehicles ===
- Rockwell HiMAT

== Research laboratory ==
Rockwell International had a major research laboratory complex in Thousand Oaks, Ventura County, California. It was founded and built by North American Aviation in 1962, as the North American Science Center. In 1973 it became the Rockwell International Science Center.

The laboratory did independent contract research for the U.S. Government, and also provided research services for the company's business units. It was famous for its research in: advanced materials, particularly ceramics; for its infrared imagers; for its research in liquid-crystal displays; and for its high-speed electronics. The laboratory invented metalorganic vapour-phase epitaxy (MOVPE), also commonly known as Metal Organic Chemical Vapor Deposition (MOCVD). It also achieved fame in selected areas of information science, notably human-computer interaction, augmented reality, multimedia systems, and diagnostics. Rockwell Science Center led the United States Army Research Laboratory's Advanced Displays Federated Laboratory Consortium in the late 1990s. In 2000, the infrared imaging division of the laboratory moved into a new building in Camarillo, California.

After Rockwell International's breakup in 2001, the laboratory was spun off as a semi-autonomous company called Rockwell Scientific, half owned by Rockwell Collins and half owned by Rockwell Automation. In 2006, the main laboratory and infrared imaging division were sold to Teledyne Corporation. Teledyne made the laboratory complex in Thousand Oaks into its corporate headquarters. A reduced but active research and development operation continues there, under the name Teledyne Scientific & Imaging, LLC.
