= Harold F. Smiddy =

American engineer and business manager

Harold Francis Smiddy
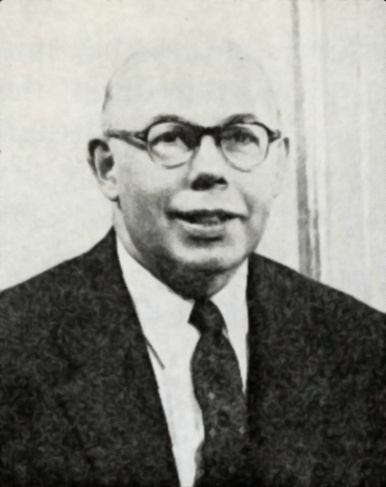
- Harold F. Smiddy
- Born: June 3, 1900; Southborough, Massachusetts
- Died: September 8, 1978 (aged 78); New York City
- Occupations: business manager management consultant
- Employer: 17th President of General Electric

Harold Francis Smiddy (June 3, 1900 – 8 September 1978) was an American engineer, business manager, and management consultant, known as the 17th president of General Electric, and recipient of the Henry Laurence Gantt Medal in 1957.

== Live and work ==
=== Youth, education and early career ===
Smiddy was born in 1900 in Southborough, Massachusetts to William Smiddy and Catherine E. (Eagan) Smiddy. After attending Peters High School from 1912 to 1916, he obtained his BSc from the Massachusetts Institute of Technology in the 1920.

Smiddy started his career in industry as engineer in training at the engineer in training Public Service Electrical Company in Newark. New Jersey, now part of PSE&G, in the year 1920–21. In 1921 he joined the West Penn Power Corporation in Pittsburgh, now part of FirstEnergy [where in the next nine years he climbed up from service engineer, assistant distribution engineer, assistant to the commercial manager and assistant to the r.p., to operating manager.

In 1930 Smiddy joined the Electric Bond and Share Company in New York, a holding company that sold securities of electric utilities created by General Electric in 1905. Here he was vice president of the operating department for a year, assistant to the executive for two years, and head of the commercial department for another two years. After the Public Utility Holding Company Act of 1935 the company was restructured to Ebasco Services, Inc., and he served another two years as head of its sales department.

=== Further career ===
In 1937 Smiddy joined the Central Region corporation, where he was operation sponsor for three years, chief operating sponsor for a year, and head of the operation department and director for another year. In 1943 he joined Booz, Allen & Hamilton, where he started as consulting engineer, and was general partner from 1943 to 1948.

In 1948 he joined the president's staff of General Electric (GE) in New York, and was general manager at GE's chemical department in Pittsfield, Massachusetts. From 1948 to 1951 he was general manager at GE's air conditioning department in Bloomfield, New York. He eventually became vice-president and then the 17th president of General Electric Company.

In 1957 the American Management Association and the ASME awarded Smiddy the annual Henry Laurence Gantt Medal. In 1958 he received the Wallace Clark Award, and in 1961 he was awarded an honorary LL.D. from Ithaca College. In 1962 he was elected President of the Academy of Management.

== Selected publications ==
- Harold F. Smiddy. Managerial progress in the sixties, 1970.
- Greenwood, Ronald G., Harold F. Smiddy, and Melvin Zimet. The evolving science of management: The collected papers of Harold Smiddy and papers by others in his honor. New York: AMACOM, 1979.

Articles, a selection

- Smiddy, Harold F., and Lionel Naum. "Evolution of a “science of managing” in America." Management Science 1.1 (1954): 1-31.
- Smiddy, Harold F. "General Electric's Philosophy and Approach for Manager Development." American Management Association, 1955.
- Smiddy, Harold F. "Integrating and Motivating for Effective Performance." Management Consultation Services, General Electric, 1955.
- Smiddy, Harold F. "Managerial Decision-Making." Journal of Occupational and Environmental Medicine 1.3 (1959): 190.
- Smiddy, Harold F. "Deciding," In: Maynard, Harold B. ed. Top management handbook, New York,: MaGraw-Hill, 1960. p. 267-300
- Smiddy, Harold F. "Planning, Anticipating and Managing." Management Science 2 (1964): 83–91.
