= Richard Redwood Deupree =

American businessman

Richard Redwood (Red) Deupree (May 7, 1885 - March 14, 1974) was an American businessman, president of Procter & Gamble and chairman of its board. He was the first Procter & Gamble president who was not a Procter or Gamble family member, and was recipient of the Henry Laurence Gantt Medal in 1959.

== Life and work ==
Deupree was born in 1885 in Norwood, Nelson County, Virginia to Richard Overton Deupree and Susan Elizabeth "Bettie" (Redwood) Deupree. His father descended from the Frenchman Thomas Du Pre, who in the early 1700s had settled in Virginia.

After a public school in Covington, Kentucky, Deupree started his career in industry as clerk at the South Covington Cincinnati Street Railway Company in 1901 at the age of 16. In 1905 he started his lifelong career at Procter & Gamble, where he was its president from 1930 to 1948, and its chairman of the board from 1948 to 1959.

In 1959 the American Management Association and the ASME awarded Deupree the annual Henry Laurence Gantt Medal.

== Selected publications ==
- Deupree, Richard Redwood. Management's Responsibilities to Employees. A Talk Before the Alumni Conference, Harvard Business School, Boston, Mass., June 12, 1948. Harvard University Press, 1948.
