= D. Robert Yarnall =

American mechanical engineer

David Robert Yarnall, Sr. (June 28, 1878 – September 11, 1967) was an American mechanical engineer, co-founder and president of the Yarnall Waring Company in Philadelphia, and the 65th president of the American Society of Mechanical Engineers in 1946–47.

Yarnall was born in 1878 in Middletown Township, Delaware County, Pennsylvania as son of Edward S. Yarnall and Sidney S. (Garrett) Yarnall. After attending the Westtown School from 1892 to 1897, he obtained his Bsc in Mechanical Engineering from the University of Pennsylvania in 1901.

After graduation Yarnall started working as engineer at Coatesville Boiler Works in Coatesville, Pennsylvania, and allied companies from 1901 to 1906. In 1908 Yarnall and Bernard G. Waring founded the Yarnall Waring Company for the manufacturing of specialty valves for power plants. He served as president of the company until 1957, and afterwards as chairman of the board.

Yarnall was a respected leader within the Religious Society of Friends in the Philadelphia area. He volunteered to lead Quaker relief efforts in Germany after World War I, and was a founding member in the 1920s of the Business Problems Group of Philadelphia Yearly Meeting. In 1938 Yarnall traveled with George Walton and Rufus Jones on a mission to Nazi Germany to try to help Jewish people there after the Kristallnacht.

In 1941 Yarnall was awarded the Hoover Medal, and in 1942 he received the honorary Doctor Engineering from Lehigh University. He was elected president of the American Society of Mechanical Engineers for the year 1946–47, and in 1947 received the honorary Doctor of Science from Haverford College. His son, Robert Yarnall Jr. (1925-1999), followed into his footsteps.

== Patents, a selection ==
- Yarnall, David Robert. "Automatic meter control." U.S. Patent No. 1,143,344. 15 Jun. 1915.
- Yarnall, David Robert. "Non-heating valve hand-wheel." U.S. Patent No. 1,218,032. 6 Mar. 1917.
- Yarnall, David Robert. "Sensitive weir-meter inlet control." U.S. Patent No. 1,307,609. 24 Jun. 1919.
- Robert, Yarnall David. "Steam trap." U.S. Patent No. 1,805,064. 12 May 1931.
- David, Robert Yarnall. "Control for valve turning and other operations." U.S. Patent No. 1,865,604. 5 Jul. 1932.
