= William Joseph Hedley =

William J. Hedley
- Born: William Joseph Hedley; November 6, 1902; St. Louis, United States
- Died: September 10, 1989 (aged 86); Clayton, Missouri, United States
- Education: Washington University in St. Louis
- Known for: Chief engineer, Wabash Railroad president of ASCE; Railroad crossing protection Mayor of Clayton, Missouri
- Awards: Hoover Medal (1973)

William Joseph Hedley (November 6, 1902 – September 10, 1989) was an American civil and consulting engineer, chief engineer at Wabash Railroad, president of the American Society of Civil Engineers in 1966, and recipient of the 1973 Hoover Medal.

== Biography ==
=== Youth, education and career ===
Hedley was born in 1902 in St. Louis as son of Charles Henry Hedley and Elizabeth Frances (Smith) Hedley. He obtained his BSc from Washington University in 1925.

After his graduation Hedley started as draftsman at the Mississippi Valley Structural Steel Co., but soon moved to the Wabash Railroad where he would spend a 42-years career. He started as a draftsman and inspector, and moved up to resident engineer and then bridge designer. In 1957 he was appointed chief engineer, and the last three years from 1963 to 1967 he was assistant vice president of the Wabash Railroad.

After his retirement for Wabash in 1967, among others, he was consulting engineer for Sverdrup & Parcel and the US Department of Transportation.

=== Other activities and acknowledgement ===
In 1949 Hedley published an AREA report, entitled "The Achievement of Railroad Grade Crossing Protection," based on extensive studies of accidents. This rapport draw national and international attention, and let to suggestions for structural provement, for example in the Netherlands.

Hedley was elected director of the American Railway Engineering Association (AREA), served as its 97th president in 1956, and was elected honorary member in 1965. In 1966 Hedley was elected president of the American Society of Civil Engineers. The Washington University awarded him an alumni citation in 1966, and six American societies of engineers awarded him the Hoover Medal in 1973. In the city of Clayton, Missouri he was elected mayor twice.

== Selected publications ==
- Hedley, William J. (ed.). Proceedings, American Railway Engineering and Maintenance-of-Way Association, Vol. 53, Chicago, Illinois, 1952.
- William J. Hedley, Interprofessional Council on Environmental Design. A positive interprofessional approach to the environmental impact statement sponsored by the Interprofessional Council on Environmental Design: summary and recommendations of the conference at Airlie House, Airlie, Virginia, November 28-30, 1972. American Society of Civil Engineers, 1972.
- Hedley, William J. Railroad-Highway Grade Crossing Surfaces. Washington, DC: Department of Transportation, Federal Highway Administration, August 1979.

Articles, a selection

- Hedley, W. J. "The Achievement of Grade Crossing Protection." Wabash Railroad (1949).
- Hedley, W. J. "The Achievement of Railroad Grade Crossing Protection." AREA Proceedings. Vol. 50. 1949.
- Hedley, Wm J. "Highway-Railway Grade Crossing Protection." (1950). p. 181-196
- Hedley, William J. "Obtaining the best crossing surface." Railway Track and Structures 76.5 (1980).
