= Donald C. Burnham =

American business executive (1915–2005)

Donald Clemens Burnham (January 23, 1915 - April 17, 2005) was an American business executive at Westinghouse Electric Corporation, and recipient of the 1971 Henry Laurence Gantt Medal. In his days at Westinghouse he was known as "Mr. Automation."

Burnham was born in Massachusetts to Charles Richardson Burnham and Freda (Clemens) Burnham. He obtained his BSc from Purdue University in 1936. He worked his way up in Westinghouse Electric Corporation, where he was president and chief executive officer from 1963 to 1968, and chairman from 1969 to 1975. He was awarded an ED with honor from the Purdue University in 1959, from the Indiana Institute of Technology in 1963, and from the Drexel Institute of Technology in 1964. In 1971 he also received the Henry Laurence Gantt Medal.

== Selected publications ==
- Donald C. Burnham. Productivity Improvement. Carnegie Press, Carnegie-Mellon University, 1973.
