= Robert Elton Brooker =

American business executive

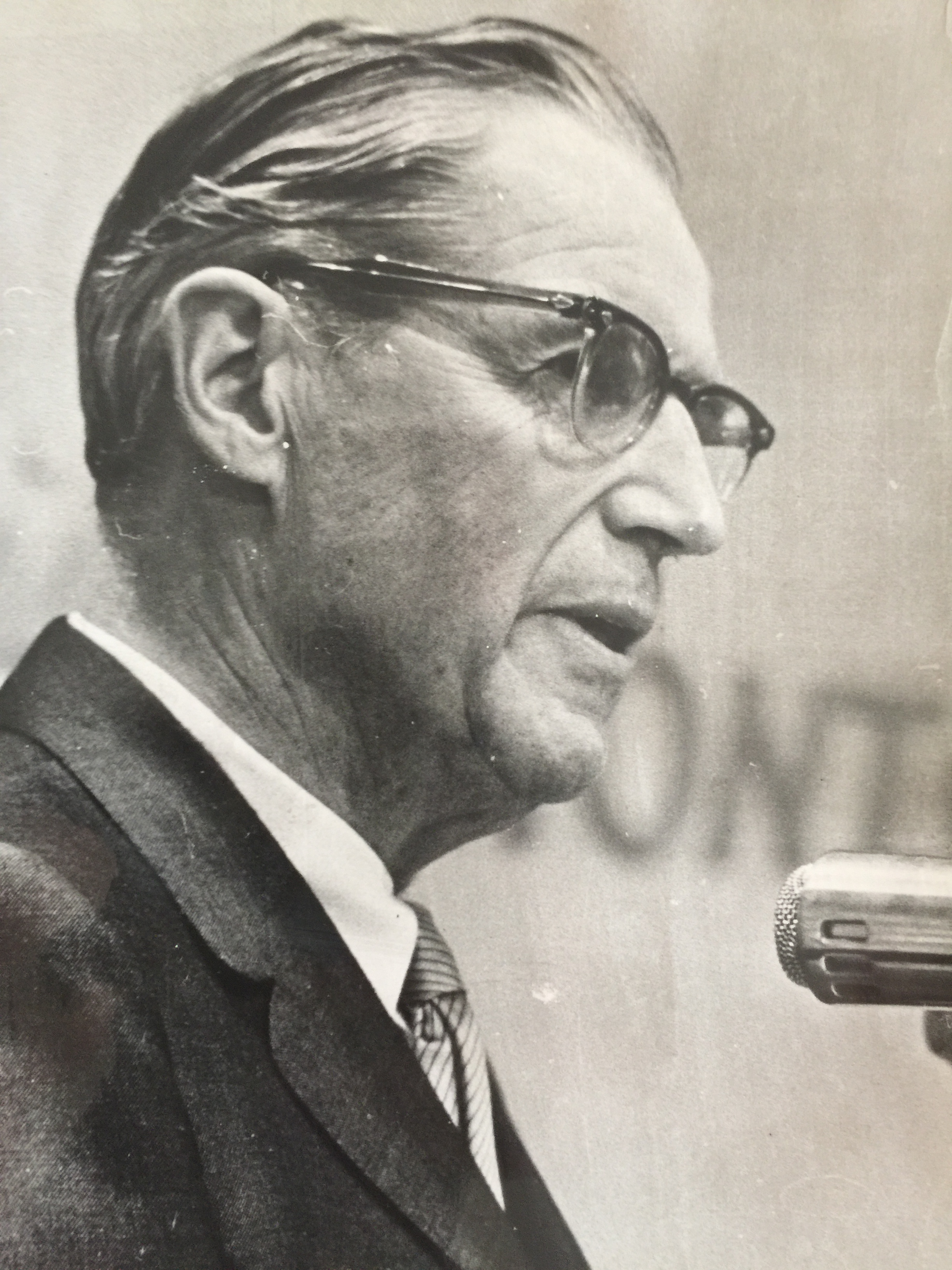
- Robert Elton Brooker
- Born: July 18, 1905; Cleveland, Ohio
- Died: May 17, 2001 (aged 95); Longwood, Florida

Robert Elton Brooker (July 18, 1905 – May 17, 2001) was an American business executive at Sears, Roebuck & Co., Whirlpool Corporation, and Montgomery Ward, and recipient of the 1972 Henry Laurence Gantt Medal.

Brooker was born in Cleveland to Robert E Brooker and Isadora Brooker. He obtained his university degree at the University of Southern California. He started his career in industry at Southern California Edison Co. from 1928 to 1934, and from 1934 to 1944 he worked at the Firestone Tire and Rubber Company. In 1944 he started at Sears, Roebuck & Co., where he became vice-president.

From 1958 to 1961 he was president of the Whirlpool Corporation. In 1961 he joined Montgomery Ward as president until 1966. He served another four years as chair, and from 1970 to at least 1974 he was chair of the executive committee. In 1972 he received the Henry Laurence Gantt Medal.

== Personal life ==
Robert Elton Brooker was born in Cleveland, Ohio, the son of Robert E Brooker and Isadora Brooker. His father was a Cleveland baker. He earned his B.A. in civil engineering from the University of Southern California in 1927. After college Brooker spent six years working for the power company Southern California Edison. At the age of 95, Brooker died in Longwood, Florida on May 17, 2001, survived by his wife Sarah Burton Harrison Brooker and two children.

== Whirlpool Corporation ==
Leaving Southern California Edison, Brooker worked for ten years at Firestone Tire and Rubber Company running all the Firestone Stores in the western states. In 1944 he was recruited by Sears, where he worked under Robert E. Wood, a retired U.S. Army brigadier general who was then the company's president. Brooker rose through the ranks, becoming head of manufacturing, a member of Sears' board of directors, and, in 1958, president of the newly formed Whirlpool Corporation. At the 1959 American National Exhibition in Moscow, Brooker supervised the Whirlpool kitchen, the exhibit that prompted the Kitchen Debate between then-Vice President Richard Nixon and Soviet Premier Nikita Khrushchev. At Whirlpool, Brooker applied the systems of General Wood, developing long-term relationships with suppliers and treating people fairly.

== Montgomery Ward ==
In 1961 then-president John Barr hired Robert Brooker to lead Montgomery Ward as president in its turnaround. Brooker brought with him a number of key new management people, including Edward Donnell, former manager of Sears' Los Angeles stores.

Ward's new management team achieved the turnaround, reducing the number of suppliers from 15,000 to 7,000 and the number of brands being carried from 168 to 16. Ward's private brands were given 95 percent of the volume compared with 40 percent in 1960. The results of these changes were lower handling costs and higher quality standards. Buying was centralized but store operations were decentralized, under a new territory system modeled after Sears.

In 1966, Ed Donnell was named President of Montgomery Ward. Brooker continued as chairmen and chief executive officer until the mid-1970s. In 1968 as Brooker helped engineer a friendly merger with the Container Corporation of America; the new company was named MARCOR. In 1974, Mobile Oil bought MARCOR.

== Bettering Communities ==
Under Brooker's leadership at Montgomery Ward the Ward's store managers became more involved in their community's affairs. Brooker realized he had to apply the methods he used in business leadership to getting people who represented Montgomery Ward to be more involved in their own communities. Brooker once said, "It's sound economic sense to preserve an environment in which we all do our fair share for our community. It's the greatest product in the world to sell."

When Montgomery Ward's headquarters needed new space, the company needed to decide if it would move to a safer location, as Sears had already announced, or to stay put. Brooker decided the company would remain and work with its neighborhood to better the environment. Brooker making the commitment to invest in its neighborhood helped clear up one of the more explosive areas in Chicago.

== Honors ==
In 1972 Robert Elton Brooker received the Henry Laurence Gantt Medal for distinguished achievement in management and service to the community.
