= Kearney and Trecker =

American machine manufacturer

- Industry: Manufacturing
- Founded: 1892; 133 years ago in West Allis, Wisconsin, U.S.
- Founder: Edward J. Kearney and Theodore Trecker
- Defunct: 1991
- Headquarters: West Allis
- Products: Precision machine tools
- Number of employees: 2250 (1955)

Kearney and Trecker founded in 1898 by Edward J. Kearney and Theodore Trecker was a machine manufacturer based in West Allis, Wisconsin. It became one of the largest machine tool suppliers in the world.

== History ==
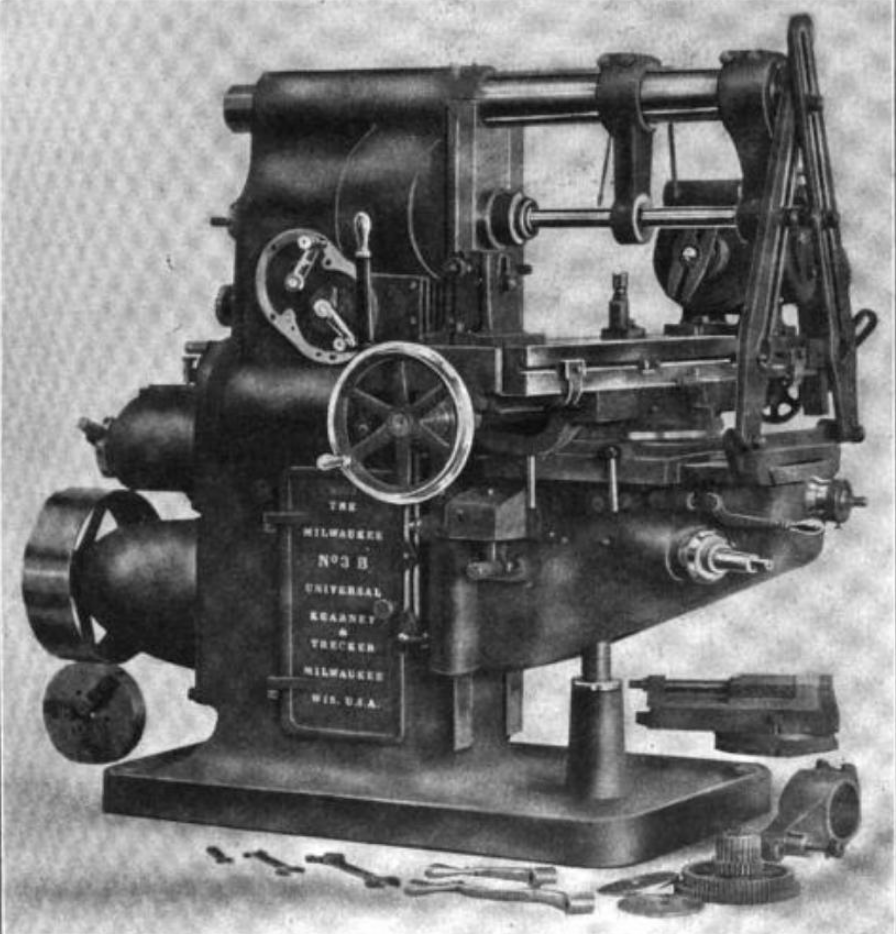
Kearney and Trecker - The Milwaukee No. 3-B Universal Miller

The company was founded in 1898 and their first location was above a small shop. They soon became known for created milling machines and precision machine tools. By 1943 they were one of the three largest milling machine manufacturers in the United States.

By 1955 the company had grown to become one of the largest machine tool suppliers in the world. The factories of Kearney & Trecker covered a 95-acre compound. In 1955 they had 2,250 employees.

In 1965 the company was a leading automated tool maker, and had annual sales of more than 47 million dollars. They manufactured more than 100 different boring and milling machines. They proposed a merger with the Rockwell-Standard corporation in 1965 to be voted on by share holders. In May of 1966 the merger was canceled.

In 1979 Kearney & Trecker merged with the Cross Company, forming Cross & Trecker, which was purchased 12 years later by Giddings & Lewis, Inc.
