= Paul Eugene Holden =

American mechanical engineer (1893–1976)

- Born: September 17, 1893; Indianapolis, Indiana, U.S.
- Died: April 9, 1976 (aged 82)
- Education: Purdue University (BSc)
- Occupation: Mechanical engineer

Paul Eugene Holden (September 17, 1893 – April 9, 1976) was an American mechanical engineer, and Professor of Industrial Management at the Stanford Graduate School of Business, who was awarded the 1941 Henry Laurence Gantt Medal for his contributions to management.

== Biography ==
=== Youth and early career in industry ===
Born and raised in Indianapolis, Indiana, Holden attended elementary, high school and Purdue University, where in 1916 he obtained his BSc in mechanical engineering. After graduation Holden started his career at the Indianapolis manufacturer of Saws, Saw Tools and Machine Knives E.C. Atkins & Company in 1916 as a special apprentice or special assistant. The next year he became army ordnance officer in World War I, and upon his return at E.C. Atkins & Co. he got promoted to production manager in 1919 of their Canadian plant in Hamilton, Ontario.

In 1920 he moved to New York, where he was assistant production manager at Remington Typewriter Company for a year, and industrial engineer at the library bureau in Ilion, New York for another year. In 1922 he joined the United States Chamber of Commerce, where he was assistant manager for the Department of Manufacture for another three years.

=== Stanford professor and consulting engineer in interwar period ===
In 1925 Holden moved west joining the faculty of the new Stanford Graduate School of Business, where he was appointed Professor of Industrial Management. In the further interwar period he was also consulting engineer at many Pacific Coast companies, national and international.

Selected by President Herbert Hoover, he had joined a commission to reorganize the United States Patent Office. For the American Engineering Council he conducted a nationwide study of safety and production in 1926. In the year 1930-31 he cooperated with Henry Wallace Clark to study major European companies in France, Germany, and Denmark. During World War II he became an industrial advisor to the Office of Production Management.

=== Stanford professor and board member after war period ===
After the war Holden continued to serve as a Professor at the Stanford Graduate School of Business, and in 1952 was the founding director of its executive education program until 1961. In 1958 he was also the founding director of the Stanford Sloan Program, where he served until 1962. Upon his retired as a Professor in 1959, he was appointed Professor Emeritus.

In the late 1940s Holden joined Booz Allen Hamilton as a senior consultant in the field of top management: organization and control until his retirement in 1959. From 1962 to 1968 he served another five years as a senior management consultant with the Stanford Research Institute. Over the years he had also joined the boards of directors and board of trustees from several minor public and private companies, and served in several professional organizations.

In recognition of his contributions to the management profession Holden was awarded the Henry Laurence Gantt Medal in 1941 by the Academy of Management and the ASME. In 1975 former students, friends and business established the Paul E. Holden Endowed Professorship in Management at Stanford.

== Reception ==
Holden made an impression on a number of American captains of industry, and politicians. One of them was David Packard, who in a 1952 interview recalled Holden's views on management. He told the reporter:

"Somehow, we got into a discussion of the responsibility of management... Holden made the point that management’s responsibility is to the shareholders -- that’s the end of it. And I objected. I said, ‘I think you’re absolutely wrong. Management has a responsibility to its employees, it has a responsibility to its customers, it has a responsibility to the community at large.’ And they almost laughed me out of the room."

Holden had shared this opinion on a 1942 Stanford conference on wartime production. Contributions from industries like Standard Oil and Westinghouse Electric and Westinghouse Electric under the presidency by Holden, who was considered the major management guru of the day.

One of Holden's more notable students was the Republican politician. Victor Veysey, who did his PhD work at Stanford and became Holden's assistant. In a 1993-94 interview he shared the following memory of that time:

"I got a teaching assistantship with Professor Paul Holden, who was the outstanding teacher in industrial management at Stanford Business School. That went along pretty well. I was taking a mixture of courses to round out what I didn’t have, which would give me a minor in engineering and a major in industrial management. Then, also, I took quite a few industrial-relations courses at that time with Paul Eliel of their Industrial Relations Center. Paul Holden called two or three of us in one day and said, “Well, I’ve got news for you; I’m going to Washington.” He had been appointed to head up the Materials Allocation Program for the government. And he said, “Now, here’s the textbook, and here’s the class, and here’s the roll book, and you’re on.” [Laughter] That was quite a surprise. So I completed teaching Holden’s courses that year."

In return Veysey never completed his dissertation, but went into politics instead.

== Publications ==
- Holden, Paul Eugene, Lounsbury Spaight Fish, and Hubert L. Smith. Top-management organization and control: a research study of the management policies and practices of thirty-one leading industrial corporations. (1941).
- Holden, Paul Eugene, Carlton Anker Pederson, and Gayton E. Germane. Top management. McGraw-Hill Book Company, 1968.
