= Thomas E. Millsop =

Thomas Elliott Millsop (December 4, 1898 — September 12, 1967) was an American corporation executive, chairman and chief executive officer of National Steel Corporation, and recipient of the Henry Laurence Gantt Medal in 1952.

== Live and work ==
Born and raised in Sharon, Pennsylvania. He was the son of a Scotch immigrant, attended the public schools in the city and served at the US Marine Corps from 1917 to 1919.

In 1919 Millsop started his career in industry at the tank-car producer Standard Tank Car Co. as riveter, and worked his way up to foreman, assistant purchasing agent, and eventually purchasing Agent. After one year at Rotter-Spear Co. of Cleveland, Ohio, in 1924-25, he was returned to Standard Tank Car Co. and became production manager for another two years.

In 1927 Millsop joined the Weirton Steel Co. division of the National Steel Corporation, where he moved up the ladder from salesman to assistant sales manager, to assistant to the president, to become the vice-president and eventually president of Weirton Steel. By the time he got appointed president, 1936, he was the youngest man ever in charge of a major American steel company.

In 1952 Millsop was awarded the Horatio Alger Award of the American Schools and Colleges Association, and the Henry Laurence Gantt Medal by the American Management Association and the ASME. In 1958 the National Management Association elected him "Management Man of the Year, and in 1961 AIME awarded him the AIME Benjamin F. Fairless Award for his "accomplishments in behalf of the steel industry, for his support of continuing technical progress in the industry, and for his civic endeavors."

== Reception ==
Thomas E. Millsop was credited in the West Virginia Legislature House of Delegates in 1966 as

"... the son of a Scotch immigrant rose from the rank of a day laborer to that of one of the truly great leaders of American industry, his rapid advance being one of the profound success stories of an industry that has known many success stories."
