= Arthur Howland Young =

American engineer and lecturer

Arthur Howland Young (December 19, 1882 - March 4, 1964) was an American engineer, vice president of U.S. Steel, lecturer at the Harvard Graduate School of Business Administration and the California Institute of Technology, pioneer of management-labor relations, and recipient of the Henry Laurence Gantt Medal in 1933.

== Biography ==
Young was born in Joliet, Illinois to Edward Howland Young and Carrie E. Chidsey Young. Young had received some regular education, and started his career at young age as laborer.

Young worked his way up, and started in the steel industry at the south Chicago plants of the Illinois Steel Company. Later he joined the International Harvester Company, where he became manager of industrial relations. In World War I he served as chief safety experts of arsenal and navy. From 1918 to 1937 he spend the rest of his career at United States Steel, where he had been vice president of the corporation.

In 1955 Young was one of the most prominent opponents of the National Labor Relations Act. In a famous 1935 comment he had stated he would "rather go to jail or be convicted as a felon... [than accept] any formula for the conduct of human relationships in industry imposed on us by demogogues."

Young furthermore was president of the National Safety Council, and lecturer in industrial relations at the Harvard Graduate School of Business Administration from 1929 to 1934 and at Stanford University on the Caltech faculty from 1939 to 1952. During World War II he was special consultant to the Secretary of War and took part in the President's Council of Personnel Administration and the Federal Advisory Council of United States Employment Service.

In 1933 Young was awarded the Henry Laurence Gantt Medal by the American Management Association and the ASME for his pioneering work in safety and industrial relations for United States Steel Corporation. In 1944 the US Navy awarded him the Meritorious Civilian Service Emblem.

== Selected publications ==
- George F. Johnson, Arthur H. Young, Wm. E. Mackenzie, W. S. Rogers, M. R. Lott, F. N. Macpherson, The Management and the worker, Chicago, A.W. Shaw company, 1920.
- Arthur Howland Young, Evaluating personnel work in industry, 1924

Articles, a selection

- Arthur H. Young. "Caltech's new industrial relations section," Caltech Campus Pubs, June 1949
