= Arthur Clinton Spurr =

American lawyer

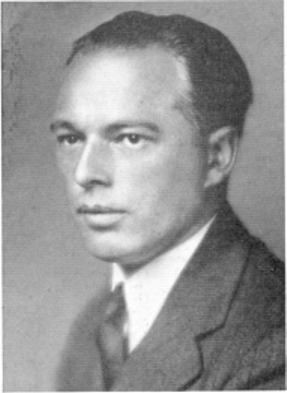
Arthur C. Spurr, 1920s

Arthur Clinton Spurr (August 27, 1889 - March 1971) was an American lawyer, manager, consulting engineer, business executive at the Wheeling Traction Company and President of the Monongahela Power Company. He is known as public utility executive and investment counselor, and as recipient of the Henry Laurence Gantt Medal in 1949.

== Biography ==
=== Youth and early career ===
Spurr was born in 1889 in Valley City, North Dakota to Benjamin Frederick Moore, who was archdeacon, and Isabell (Stewart) Spurr. After attending Valley City High School, he obtained his bachelor of laws degree from Yale Law School in 1910, and his A.B. from Yale College in 1913.

After his graduation in 1913 Spurr started his career in industry at the Baltimore & Ohio Railroad as a student employee on the staff of its third vice-president. In 1917 he served in World War I in the 21st Engineers as First Lieutenant at the Western Front, where he took part in the Battle of Saint-Mihiel.

=== Further career ===
Back in the States in 1919 he was appointed traffic manager at the East Coast Fisheries Company in Rockland, Maine. In 1920 he moved Pittsburgh, and worked as consulting engineer for the Philadelphia Company, a parent company of the Pittsburgh Railways Company. From February 1, 1924, to October 1, 1925, he was research manager of the Pittsburgh Railways Company, after which he was appointed general manager of the Wheeling Traction Company in 1925.

In 1935 he was appointed president of the Monongahela Power Company, a regulated subsidiary of Allegheny Energy, where he served the next twenty years until his retirement in 1955. In between, in World War II, Spurr had served as War Finance Committee chairman for West Virginia.

In recognition of his work, Spurr was awarded the Thomas W. Martin Rural Electrification in 1940, and the Henry Laurence Gantt Medal in 1949 for "distinguished achievement in industrial management as a service to the community." In 1951 Marietta College awarded an Honorary Degrees, a Doctor of Laws.
