= Charles R. Hook Sr. =

American industrialist

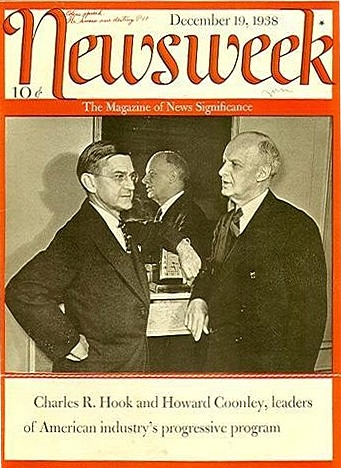
Hook and Howard Coonley in 1938.

Charles Ruffin Hook Sr. (July 12, 1880 - November 15, 1963) was an American industrialist, second president of Armco Steel Corp., and recipient of the Henry Laurence Gantt Medal in 1950.

== Life and work ==
Hook was born and raised in Cincinnati, Hamilton County as son of Henry Hamilton Hook and Katherine (Klusman) Hook. He attended Walnut Hills High School, where he graduated in 1898.

In 1902 Hook started his lifelong career at Armco as night superintendent at the sheet mill. Hook served as president of Armco Steel from 1930 to 1948, and later served as chairman of its board from 1948 to 1959. In the 1930s he also served as president of the National Association of Manufacturers.

Hook was awarded a series of honorary degrees, such as the D.Eng from Michigan College of Mining and Technology in 1935, and from the Stevens Institute of Technology in 1944; the LL.D. from Ohio State University in 1939, from Harding College in 1941, from Miami University in 1951, from Cedarville University in 1951, from Marietta College in 1952, and from Centre College in 1955; the DCS from Oglethorpe University in 1938; the Dr. Humanities from Muskingum University in 1950; and the Dr. Public Service from the University of Cincinnati in 1956.

In 1950 Hook was awarded by the American Management Association and ASME the Henry Laurence Gantt Medal for his accomplishments and for being a "proponent of incentives and industrial peace at Armco Steel Corporation." in 1950.

Hook died in Maryland November 15, 1963 at the age of 83.
