= Henry Gantt =

American engineer (1861–1919)

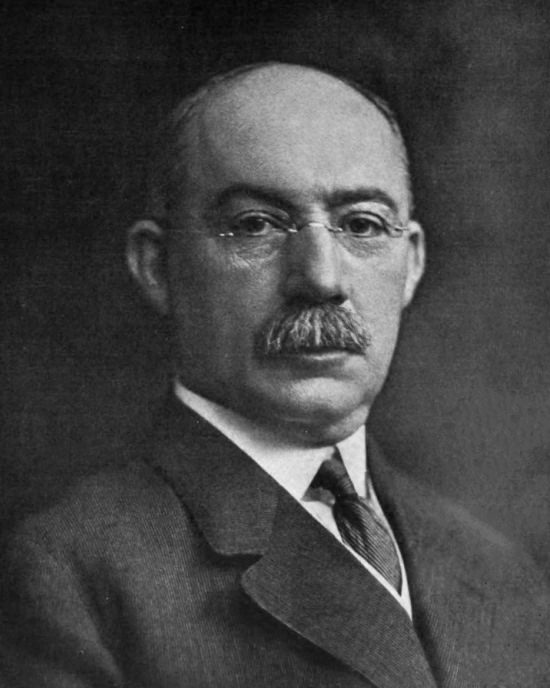
- Henry Laurence. Gantt, 1916
- Born: Henry Laurence Gantt; May 20, 1861; Calvert County, Maryland, U.S.
- Died: November 23, 1919 (aged 58); Montclair, New Jersey, U.S.
- Education: Johns Hopkins University (A.B.); Stevens Institute of Technology (M.E.)
- Known for: Gantt chart
- Scientific career
- Fields: Scientific management

Henry Laurence Gantt (/ɡænt/; May 20, 1861 – November 23, 1919) was an American mechanical engineer and management consultant who worked in the development of scientific management. He created the Gantt chart in the 1910s.

Gantt charts were employed on major infrastructure projects including the Hoover Dam and Interstate highway system and continue to be an important tool in project management and program management.

Gantt is also recognized as an early proponent of the social responsibility of businesses.

== Biography ==
=== Early life, education and family ===
Gantt was born to a prosperous plantation family in Calvert County, Maryland, at the outbreak of the American Civil War. Following the end of the war, the family forfeited their land and slaves before relocating to Baltimore.

He graduated from McDonogh School in 1878 and from Johns Hopkins University in 1880, and then returned to the McDonogh School to teach for three years. He subsequently received a master's degree in mechanical engineering from the Stevens Institute of Technology in New Jersey. Henry Gantt married Mary E. Snow of Fitchburg, Massachusetts, on November 29, 1899.

=== Career ===
In 1884, Gantt began working as a draughtsman at the iron foundry and machine-shop Poole & Hunt in Baltimore.

In 1887 he joined Frederick W. Taylor, initially as an assistant. Here he began applying scientific management principles to the work at Midvale Steel and Bethlehem Steel, working there with Taylor until 1893. They jointly received six patents and he followed Taylor to Simonds Rolling Company before they went to Bethlehem Steel for a consulting project. He credited Taylor with being the first to study every element of the labor problem and has been referred to as one of the most influential of Taylor's associates.

In 1908-09, he undertook projects at Joseph Bancroft & Sons Company and Williams & Wilkins.

In 1911, Gantt along with Taylor followers Frank Gilbreth and Carl Barth founded The Society to Promote the Science of Management, later known as the Taylor Society, to promote Taylor's methods and philosophy in industry.

From 1902 to 1919 Gantt worked as a private consultant to industry on efficiency improvement and was active in promoting scientific management, as Taylor's general approach came to be called.

In his later career as an industrial consultant, following the invention of the Gantt chart, he designed the 'task and bonus' system of wage payment and additional measurement methods for worker efficiency and productivity.

In 1916, influenced by Thorsten Veblen Gantt set up the New Machine, an association which sought to apply the criteria of industrial efficiency to the political process. With the Marxist Walter Polakov he led a breakaway from the 1916 ASME conference to call for socializing industrial production under the control of managers incorporating Polakov's analysis of inefficiency in the industrial context.

Henry Gantt is listed under Stevens Institute of Technology alumni. The American Society of Mechanical Engineers (ASME) published his biography in 1934 and awards an annual medal in honor of Henry Laurence Gantt.

== Work ==
Henry Gantt's legacy to project management is the following:

- The Gantt chart: Still accepted as an important management tool today, the Gantt chart is a graphical format that is used for the planning, scheduling, and controlling of work, including recording the progress of a project and its stages. The chart has a modern variation, Program Evaluation and Review Technique (PERT).
- Industrial Efficiency: Industrial efficiency can only be produced by the application of scientific analysis to all aspects of the work in progress. The industrial management role is to improve the system by eliminating chance and accidents.
- The Task and Bonus System: He linked the bonus paid to managers to how well they taught their employees to improve performance.
- The social responsibility of business: He believed that businesses have obligations to the welfare of the society in which they operate.

=== Gantt charts ===
A Gantt chart showing three kinds of schedule dependencies (in red) and percent complete indications

Gantt created many different types of charts. He designed his charts so that foremen or other supervisors could quickly know whether production was on schedule, ahead of schedule, or behind schedule.

Gantt (1903) describes two types of balances:

- the “man’s record”, which shows what each worker should do and did do, and
- the “daily balance of work”, which shows the amount of work to be done and the amount that is done.

Gantt gives an example with orders that will require many days to complete. The daily balance has rows for each day and columns for each part or each operation. At the top of each column is the amount needed. The amount entered in the appropriate cell is the number of parts done each day and the cumulative total for that part. Heavy horizontal lines indicate the starting date and the date that the order should be done. According to Gantt, the graphical daily balance is “a method of scheduling and recording work”. In this 1903 article, Gantt also describes the use of:

- “production cards” for assigning work to each operator and recording how much was done each day.

=== Work, Wages, and Profits, 1916 ===
In his 1916 book Work, Wages, and Profits Gantt explicitly discusses scheduling, especially in the job shop environment. He proposes giving to the foreman each day an “order of work” that is an ordered list of jobs to be done that day. Moreover, he discusses the need to coordinate activities to avoid “interferences”. However, he also warns that the most elegant schedules created by planning offices are useless if they are ignored, a situation that he observed. More generally, he addresses the value of applying scientific analysis to the study of work and labor to develop general laws that can lead to high levels of industrial efficiency.

=== Organizing for Work, 1919 ===
In his 1919 book Organizing for Work Gantt gives two principles for his charts:

- one, measure activities by the amount of time needed to complete them;
- two, the space on the chart can be used to represent the amount of the activity that should have been done in that time.

Gantt shows a progress chart that indicates for each month of the year, using a thin horizontal line, the number of items produced during that month. In addition, a thick horizontal line indicates the number of items produced during the year. Each row in the chart corresponds to an order for parts from a specific contractor, and each row indicates the starting month and ending month of the deliveries. It is the closest thing to the Gantt charts typically used today in scheduling systems, though it is at a higher level than machine scheduling.

Gantt's machine record chart and man record chart are quite similar, though they show both the actual working time for each day and the cumulative working time for a week. Each row of the chart corresponds to an individual machine or operator. These charts do not indicate which tasks were to be done, however.

In addition to these technical enhancements, this book also dealt with the broader theme of the obligations of business to society and the particular need for means of reconciling pursuit of profits with the welfare of society. He argued that there needed to be a fair distribution of returns from industry to all segments of the community or society might seek to take control of the means of production. He favored small versus large businesses to promote competition, lower prices and provide better quality and service to customers.

=== Henry Gantt and Karol Adamiecki ===
A novel method of displaying interdependencies of processes to increase visibility of production schedules was invented in 1896 by Karol Adamiecki, which was similar to the one defined by Gantt in 1903. However, Adamiecki did not publish his works in a language popular in the West; hence Gantt was able to popularize a similar method, which he developed around the years 1910–1915, and the solution became attributed to Gantt. With minor modifications, what originated as the Adamiecki's chart is now more commonly referred to as the Gantt Chart.

== Criticism ==
Gantt's “task and bonus system” has drawn comparisons to the "task" system used by slave owners (vs the "gang" system, under which workers would be highly supervised for specific periods of time). Gantt's father, Virgil, owned more than 60 slaves. Gantt, himself, was a vocal critic of slavery, and viewed Scientific Management as adapting slavery practices for the better. One critic described this as "scientific management replicated slavery’s extractive techniques while jettisoning the institution itself."

== Publications ==
Gantt published several articles and books. A selection:

- Henry L. Gantt, Dabney Herndon Maury (1884) "The Efficiency of Fluid in Vapor Engines", in: Van Nostrand's engineering magazine, v. 31 July–Dec 1884. p. 413–433
- H. L. Gantt (1902). "A Bonus System of Rewarding Labor", in: Transactions of the ASME 23:341-72.
- Henry L. Gantt (1903) "A graphical daily balance in manufacture", in: Transactions of the American Society of Mechanical Engineers, 24:1322–1336
- Henry L. Gantt (1908) Training Workmen in Habits of Industry and Cooperation. 12 pages.
- Henry L. Gantt (1910) The Compensation of Workmen ...: A Lecture Delivered Before the Harvard Graduate School of Business Administration, Dec. 15, 1910. 116 pages.
- Henry L. Gantt (1910), Work, Wages, and Profits: Their Influence on the Cost of Living, New York, New York, USA: Engineering Magazine Company, LCCN 10014590. (See also second edition, revised and enlarged.)
- Gantt, Henry L. (1916), Industrial leadership, New Haven: Yale University Press.
- Gantt, Henry L. (1919), Organizing for Work, New York, New York, USA: Harcourt, Brace, and Howe, LCCN 19014919. Reprinted by Hive Publishing Company, Easton, Maryland
