= Charles Hook Tompkins =

American architect

Charles Hook Tompkins (November 30, 1883 – December 12, 1956) was president and co-founder with his wife of the Charles H. Tompkins Construction Company, which built the United States Courthouse, the West Wing and East Wing of the White House, the Lincoln Memorial Reflecting Pool, and the National Guard Armory. His company also remodeled President Eisenhower’s farm. Tompkins Hall at The George Washington University is named in his honor.

== Early life and education ==
Tompkins was born in Baltimore, Maryland. While he initially attended Lehigh University, he transferred to the George Washington University, graduating in 1906 with a bachelor's degree in civil engineering. He was a member of Theta Delta Chi fraternity.

== Charles H. Tompkins Construction Company ==
Tompkins and his wife founded their company in 1911, and from that beginning with a few hundred dollars savings their company grew to be one of the Nation’s largest. In addition to Federal landmarks in the National Capital, he built many other large edifices here including the Dalecarlia Filtration Plant, Garfinckel’s Department Store, the Scottish Rite Temple, Tower Building, Children’s Hospital, and the new Providence Hospital.

== Honors ==
In 1956, Tompkins Hall of Engineering opened at the George Washington University, a gift of Mr. Tompkins and the late Mrs. Tompkins, both of whom had attended the University. Tompkins was awarded the honorary degree of Doctor of Engineering by the University in 1946.

From 1935 until his death, all George Washington University buildings were built under his supervision. These include Lisner Auditorium, the University Hospital, the Cancer Clinic, the University Library, Hall of Government, Strong Residence Hall and Monroe Hall. Near Washington, D.C., he was responsible for construction of 650 buildings at Fort Belvoir, the Bainbridge (Md.) Naval Training Station, and the White Oak Ordnance Laboratory. In addition to construction in the Capital City, Mr. Tompkins has built numerous structures, including several major dams in this country and abroad.

Active in business and civic organizations, Tompkins was at the time of his death a Director of Woodward & Lothrop, Riggs National Bank, the Washington Boys Club, and the Master Builders Association, and was Chairman, Metropolitan Washington Campaign, 1956, of the American Red Cross. He was a life member of the American Society of Civil Engineers and member of many other engineering and civic organizations such as the Society of American Military Engineers, the Masons (32nd Shriner) and the Rotary Club. He was a member of Cosmos Club, University and Chevy Chase Clubs.
