= Frederick C. Henderschott =

American journalist, educator, and executive

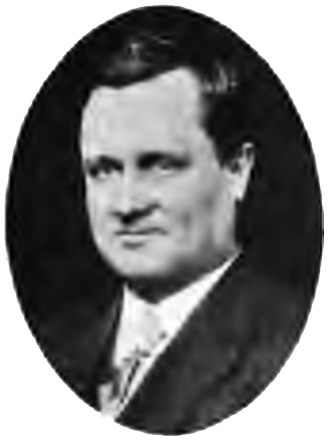
Frederick C. Henderschott, 1917

Frederick Chauncey (Fred) Henderschott (February 12, 1870 – March 30, 1934) was an American journalist, educator, and executive at the New York Edison Company, and later American Management Association. Henderschott and Lee Galloway of the New York University are considered the prime movers of The National Association of Corporation Schools, predecessor of the American Management Association.

== Biography ==
=== Youth, education and early career ===
Henderschott was born in 1870 in Tecumseh, Michigan, to William Henderschott and Ellen (Knickerbocker) Henderschott. His father's family originally came from Bavaria, Germany, and his father had been one of the original settlers in the state.

Henderschott attended the public school of his native community, and went to work in the lumber camps of the northern country at the age of eleven. At the age of seventeen, in 1887, he joined a country newspaper business in the Dakota Territory, which he leased and managed from 1888 to 1891. He then joined The Bismarck Tribune in Bismarck, North Dakota as printer apprentice.

=== Further career ===
Early 1910 Henderschott was employed by the New York Edison Company as executive secretary of manager of the company's bureau of education. By 1914 he was elected chairman of the Commercial section of the National Electric Light Association.

In 1912–13 Henderschott and Lee Galloway of the New York University were the prime movers of The National Association of Corporation Schools, initiated at a conference held at New York University on January 24, 1913. As its first president was elected Arthur Williams of the New York Edison, an electrical engineer who had worked with the early Edison power companies.

By 1920 he was managing director of The National Association of Corporation Schools under the president L.L. Park. In August 1920 the original association was turned into the National Association of Corporation Training, with Henderschott as managing director. In 1922 this association merged with the Industrial Relations Association of America, founded in 1918, into the American Management Association.

By 1928 Henderschott was managing director of the American Management Association under the presidency of W. W. Kincaid.

=== Personal and death ===
Henderschott had married Helen Blanchard on December 25, 1901, in Chicago, Illinois, and they had three children. Henderschott died at home in Pelham, New York in Westchester County on March 30, 1934, from the effects of stroke suffered a year earlier.

== Work ==
=== The National Association of Corporation Schools ===
In 1913 Henderschott, at the time educational director of the New York Edison Company, explained about the origin of The National Association of Corporation Schools, founded earlier that year. He explained:

"The idea of a national association of corporations maintaining or desiring to establish educational courses for their employees grew out of the experience of the New York Edison Company's commercial school. This company has for some years conducted free technical courses out of working hours at which attendance was optional, but the business-getting end of the industry had received little attention. In organizing a school for its salesmen the company found an enormous task on its hands. Being desirous of having the best salesmen possible, it was willing to spend large sums to perfect educational courses. A thorough canvass of existing practices in training employees for effective service was made and many corporation schools were visited. On the basis of these studies an educational system, involving lectures by experts and examinations based thereon, was inaugurated, and proved successful from the start..."

And furthermore:

"The difficulty experienced by the Edison Company in securing data on corporation schools suggested the possibilities of an association that would act as a clearing house for corporations which, seeing the advantages to be gained by educating their employees, wish to start schools. Such an association should be of great assistance in improving and enlarging courses already started and increasing the efficiency of administration of these courses..."

The National Association of Corporation Schools eventually came to life at a convention was held at New York University on January 24, 1913, at which a constitution was adopted, officers were elected and provision made for the appointment of working committees. As first president was elected Arthur Williams, an electrical engineer and executive at the New York Edison Company, as first vice-president E. St. Elmo Lewis, as second vice-president Charles Proteus Steinmetz, as secretary Lee Galloway, and as treasurer E. J. Mehren. Frederick C. Henderschott was elected assistant secretary-treasurer.

The first national convention of the association was held in September that year in Dayton, Ohio, under the auspices of the National Cash Register Company. in the first year already 30+ major corporations had joined, with in total over 500.000 employees.

== Selected publications ==
- Nelson, Dora, and Henderschott, Frederick C. Her strange marriage: or, wedded to one, but loving another : a story of intense heart interest / written in collaboration by Mrs. Dora Nelson and F.C. Henderschott. New York : J.S. Ogilvie Pub. Co., 1908.
- Henderschott, Frederic C., and Frank Ervan Weakly. The employment department and employee relations. La Salle Extension University, 1918.

Articles, a selection

- Henderschott, F. C. "The National Association of Corporation Schools." Transactions of the American Institute of Electrical Engineers 32.2 (1913): 1413–1416.
- Henderschott. "Methods of selecting men in business, in: Bulletin. The National Association of Corporation Schools. Vol. 1, no.1-6 (inc.) (1914). p. 31-45
- Henderschott, F. C. "Psychology and business." Journal of Applied Psychology 1.3 (1917): 214.
- Henderschott, F. C., et al. "Open Discussion." The Annals of the American Academy of Political and Social Science 57 (1915): 297–303.
