= Boston Edison =

Boston Edison can refer to:

- Boston-Edison, a neighborhood in Detroit, Michigan.
- Boston Edison Company, a Massachusetts utility now merged into Eversource Energy
