= Dugald C. Jackson =

American electrical engineer (1865–1951)

Dugald Caleb Jackson
- Born: February 13, 1865; Kennett Square, Pennsylvania, U.S.
- Died: July 1, 1951 (aged 86)
- Education: Penn State University
- Awards: IEEE Edison Medal (1938)
- Scientific career
- Fields: Electrical engineering
- Doctoral students: Vannevar Bush

Dugald Caleb Jackson (February 13, 1865 – July 1, 1951) was an American electrical engineer. He received the IEEE Edison Medal for "outstanding and inspiring leadership in engineering education and in the field of generation and distribution of electric power".

== Early life ==
Dugald was born into a quaker family in Kennett Square, Pennsylvania. His parents were Josiah and Mary Price Jackson. His younger brother, John Price Jackson, co-wrote some books with him and also had a career as an electrical engineer, academic, civil servant and soldier. He attended The Hill School in Pottstown before studying civil engineering at Pennsylvania State College from which he graduated in 1885.

== Early career ==
After two years teaching electrical engineering at Cornell University he moved to the University of Wisconsin in 1891 as the first professor of Electrical Engineering, heading the Department of Electrical Engineering. He specialized in alternating currents and associated machinery alongside technical issues involved in running central stations as independent power stations were known at the time.

== At MIT ==
Jackson headed the Department of Electrical Engineering of the Massachusetts Institute of Technology (MIT) from 1907 to 1935. He was proponent of student and faculty involvement with industry. Jackson established research as a part of engineering education at MIT and coordinated it with practical experience in industrial settings (for example, with the General Electric Company), and his model spread widely.

On April 3, 1911, Jackson participated in a conference at the Hotel Thorndike, in Boston encouraging closer co-operation between electric vehicle manufacturers and central station managers in the Boston area. The conference was organized by the Boston Edison Company and Jackson promised the support of the Department of Electrical Engineering of the Massachusetts Institute of Technology (MIT) in providing scientific research to support the development of the electric vehicle industry.

During his time at MIT, Jackson was elected to the American Academy of Arts and Sciences in 1911 and the American Philosophical Society in 1931.

== Works ==
- 1893 Text Book on Electromagnetism and the Construction of Dynamos
- 1895 Electricity and Magnetism
- 1896 Alternating Currents and Alternating Current Machinery (with John Price Jackson) New York: Macmillan Co.
- 1902 An Elementary Book on Electricity and Magnetism (with John Price Jackson) New York: Macmillan Co.
