= Hendershott =

Hendershott is a surname. Hendershott comes from the surname Hendershot.

== Notable people with the surname include ==
- Adam Hendershott (born 1983), American actor
- Jen Hendershott (born 1971), American fitness competitor
- Robert L. Hendershott (1898–2005), member of the American Numismatic Association Hall of Fame

Also Henderschott

- Frederick C. Henderschott (1870–1934), American journalist, educator, and executive

== See also ==
- Hendershot
