= Operation Enterprise (training program) =

Operation Enterprise (OE) is a high school and college student program sponsored by the American Management Association.

== History ==
Established in 1963, OE is a leadership training and career development program held on college campuses around the country, typically during June and July. It is designed to teach the necessary skills to succeed in business. The intensive, eight-day residential experience focuses on skills for students' future careers, and covers skills such as management, negotiation, conflict resolution, strategic planning and ethics, and improves the student's leadership, communication and presentation skills.

Since its inception, more than 10,000 students have participated in OE.

== Management simulation ==
The OE program allows students to participate in a full day of meetings and workshops, giving them the experience of a real day in management.
