= Lawrence A. Appley =

American management specialist and organizational theorist (1904-1997)

- Born: April 22, 1904; Nyack, New York
- Died: April 4, 1997 (aged 92)
- Education: Ohio Wesleyan University (B.A.)

Lawrence Asa (Larry) Appley (April 22, 1904 – April 4, 1997) was an American management specialist and organizational theorist, known for his early work on management and organization, especially quality management. In 1962 he was awarded the Henry Laurence Gantt Medal.

== Biography ==
=== Youth and education ===
Appley was born in 1904 in Nyack, New York, the youngest of three children of the Methodist minister Joseph Earl Appley and Jessie (Moore) Appley. His grandfather from his father's side had been a carpenter and shoemaker. As Methodist minister his father changed pastorates every second year along with the family. They successively lived in Pittsburgh, Meyersdale, Pennsylvania, North Tarrytown, Yonkers, Fleischmanns, Ellenville, and Kingston, New York. After primary school in those places he attended the Northfield Mount Hermon School.

After graduation in 1923, he entered the Ohio Wesleyan University. In those years he held several part-time jobs, such as high school debate coach, short-order cook, washing machine salesman, motorcycle policeman, streetcar conductor, and truck driver. In the year 1924-25 he taught eighth graders at an elementary school for a whole year. Eventually in 1927 he received his BA in English, won a Chi Phi's 1927 Sparks Scholarship Medal, and started some graduate work at Ohio State University in the summer.

By Autumn 1927 Appley was appointed speech instructor and debate coach at Colgate University, where he worked for three years. He spend the summer of 1929 at the Maxwell School of Citizenship and Public Affairs taking graduate classes in public administration, and gained his interest in business administration.

=== Early career in industry ===
In 1930 he moved to the Buffalo division of the Standard Oil Company, where he was appointed personnel manager. After the merger in 1934 to the Socony-Vacuum Oil Company, he was appointed educational director for the firm. After Socony-Vacuum Oil Company, he held a similar executive position at the Vick Chemical Company and at Montgomery Ward & Company for some time.

In 1938 Appley started consulting work besides his regular work at Socony-Vacuum. In that year he joined the United States Civil Service Commission as advisor and lecturer on personnel problems. In 1941 in Washington he became full-time advisor on civilian and personnel training to the United States Secretary of War, and in 1942 he assisted the War Manpower Commission as director of its placement bureau.

=== Later career in industry ===
From 1948 to 1968 he served as president of the American Management Association. Appley also served as board member in 35 corporations. in 1953 he was appointed by President Dwight D. Eisenhower into the Commission on Intergovernmental Relations.

Apply died at his home, April 4, 1997, in the village of Hamilton, New York.

== Publications ==
- Lawrence A. Appley, Management in Action; The Art of Getting Things Done Through People. New York: American Management Association, 3rd ed. 1956.
- Lawrence A. Appley. Management the Simple Way. American Management Association, 1956.
- Lawrence A. Appley. The Management Evolution. American Management Association, 1963.
- Lawrence A. Appley. Values in management. New York : American Management Ass., 1969.
- Lawrence A. Appley. Formula for success: A core concept of management. New York: Amacom, 1974.

Articles, a selection

- Lawrence A. Appley. "Preface" in: Ernest Dale, Planning and developing the company organization structure. No. 20. American Management Association, 1952.
- Lawrence A. Appley, "Management and the American Future," Management at Mid-Century, 1954
