= William Joseph Graham =

American insurance executive (1877–1963)

William Joseph Graham (September 23, 1877 – February 11, 1963) was an American insurance executive, who was Vice President of The Equitable Life Assurance Society of the United States. He is known as "father of group insurance," and as past-president of the American Management Association.

== Biography ==
=== Youth, education and early career ===
Graham was born in Louisville, Kentucky in 1877, son of William Thompson Graham Sr. and Anna Eulalla (MrDonogh) Graham. After attending St. Xavier College (now St. Xavier High School) in Louisville, he obtained his MA from St. Francis Xavier's College, now Xavier High School, in New York.

In 1898 Graham started his career in the insurance business at the Sun Insurance Company of America as actuary. In the same year he joined the Associate of the Actuarial Society of America, where he was elected fellow in 1902, and later a Charter Member of the Casualty. He also became an Associate of the British Institute of Actuaries.

In 1902 Graham joined the Metropolitan Life Insurance Company in New York, where in 1905 he was elected vice president and a director of the Northwestern National Life Insurance Company. In 1905 he also worked as consulting actuary. In cooperation with S. Herbert Wolfe he participated in the "investigation of the life insurance companies of New York conducted by a group of state insurance departments."

=== Later career and honors ===
In 1911 Graham joined the Equitable Life Assurance Society. From western superintendent of agencies, and superintendent of the Group Insurance Department, he was appointed second vice president of The Equitable Life Assurance Society in 1922. In 1929 he was elected vice-president and in 1937 a member of the Equitable's board of directors. He retired from the Equitable in 1948, and served on its board until 1958.

In 1930 Graham had been elected president of the American Management Association, which he co-founded. In 1938 the Hobart College awarded Graham an honorary Doctor of Laws.

=== Personal ===
Graham died at the age of 85, in 1963, in the Southside Hospital in Bay Shore, New York at Long Island.

== Selected publications ==
- Graham, William Joseph. The romance of life insurance; its past, present and future, with particular reference to the epochal investigation era of 1905-1908, Chicago, The World to-day company.

Articles, a selection

- W.J. Graham, "Impressions of the Pittsburgh Convention," in: Management Review, Volumes 9–10, 1922. p. 3-6
