= Lee Galloway =

American educator and publisher

Lee Galloway (November 29, 1871 – January 31, 1962) was an American educator, publisher, and organizational theorist. He was Professor in the School of Finance and Commerce at the New York University, and co-founders of The National Association of Corporation Schools, predecessor of the American Management Association.

== Biography ==
=== Youth, education and early career ===
Charles Lee Galloway was born in Durand, Wisconsin in 1871, son of William D. Galloway and Ellen (Laskey) Galloway, natives respectively of Canada and England. He obtained his BSc at the University of Minnesota in 1896, his MA from Columbia University in 1900, and his PhD from the New York University in 1907.

For his graduate work Galloway had spent some time in European Universities, and was visiting scholar with the British economic historian Sir William Ashley at the University of Birmingham, and with the German economist Johannes Conrad at the University of Halle.

After his graduation at the University of Minnesota in 1896, Galloway had started his working life as school teacher in Minnesota. From 1901 to 1905 he was assistant principal at a high school in Minneapolis and served as superintendent of city schools at South St. Paul and Two Harbors.

=== Further career in education and publishing ===
After his graduation at the New York University in 1907, Galloway joined their faculty. By 1911 he was assistant professor of Commerce and Industry in the New York University School of Commerce, now New York University Stern School of Business. In 1918 he was appointed Professor of Commerce and Industry, and in 1919 head of its department of business management. In 1920 he founded and became director of the school of retailing financed by the leading department stores of New York City.

In 1912 Galloway had entered the publishing business. He became chairman of the board of The Ronald Press Company, and editor-in-chief. He was consulting editor for a series Department Store Merchandise Manuals at Ronald Press in 1917, editor of the Administration Magazine and member of the Advisory Council of the Journal of Business.

In 1912-13 Galloway and Frederick C. Henderschott had played a pioneering role in the establishing of The National Association of Corporation Schools, where both continued to participate in executive roles.

=== Personal ===
Galloway married June 8, 1900 to Hetty G. Buehler, daughter of William G. Buehler of Minneapolis. She had graduated from the University of Minnesota in 1899.

== Work ==
=== Management Department at New York University ===
The New York University in 1914 introduced its first course in industrial management in a new industrial engineering program. It introduced lesson in Factory Organization and in System and Organization in Commercial Business, about the implications of scientific management for office and service activities. Nelson (1992) summarized. that in 1916 the New York University:

"... created a Management department, headed by Lee Galloway, that taught a variety of management courses and a management seminar devoted to controversies over the application of scientific management. No university responded more quickly to the opportunities of the moment. In the following years NYU introduced more specialized courses on industrial and labor management in response to the demands of the swelling student population. Yet courses disappeared as fast as they appeared, faculty turnover was high, and there was no evidence that the swollen curriculum was more than a reaction to the uproar over scientific management and the labor problems of the war period."

Galloway in 1921 published his standard work Office Management, Its Principles and Practice, which would become a well-known book in office management.

== Selected publications ==
- Galloway, Lee, George Burton Hotchkiss, and George Howard Harmon. Advertising and Correspondence. Vol. 4. Alexander Hamilton Institute, 1913.
- Galloway, Lee. Organization and management. No. 2. New York: Alexander Hamilton Institute, 1914.
- Galloway, Lee. Factory and Office Administration. Vol. 4. Alexander Hamilton Institute, 1917.
- Galloway, Lee. Office Management, Its Principles and Practice: Covering Organization, Arrangement, and Operation with Special Consideration of the Employment, Training, and Payment of Office Workers. Ronald Press, 1918.
- Galloway, Lee. Organizing the stenographic department. No. 7. The Ronald press company, 1924.

Articles, a selection

- Galloway, Lee. "Correspondence school instruction by non-academic institutions." The Annals of the American Academy of Political and Social Science 67.1 (1916): 202–209.
