= Edison Illuminating Company =

Electric utility company by Thomas Edison

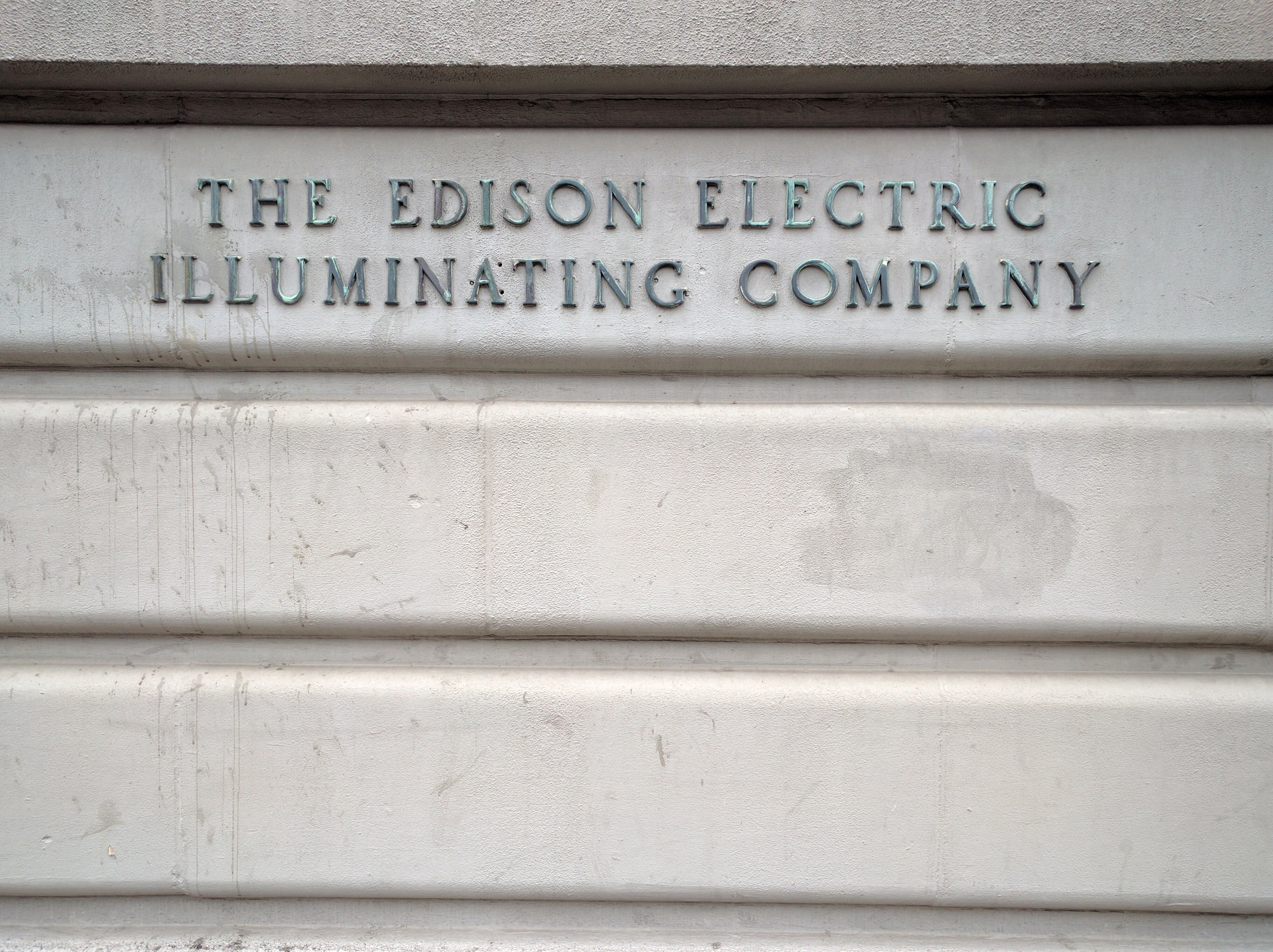
- The Edison Illuminating Company sign on Beacon Street in Boston, Massachusetts
- Industry: Electricity
- Founded: December 17, 1880; 144 years ago in New York City, United States
- Founder: Thomas Edison
- Defunct: 1901; 124 years ago
- Fate: Purchased by Consolidated Gas
- Successor: Consolidated Edison
- Key people: Henry Ford (chief engineer); James Hood Wright (board member)

The Edison Illuminating Company was established by Thomas Edison on December 17, 1880, to construct electrical generating stations, initially in New York City. The company was the prototype for other local illuminating companies that were established in the United States during the 1880s.

== History ==
=== Pearl Street Station ===
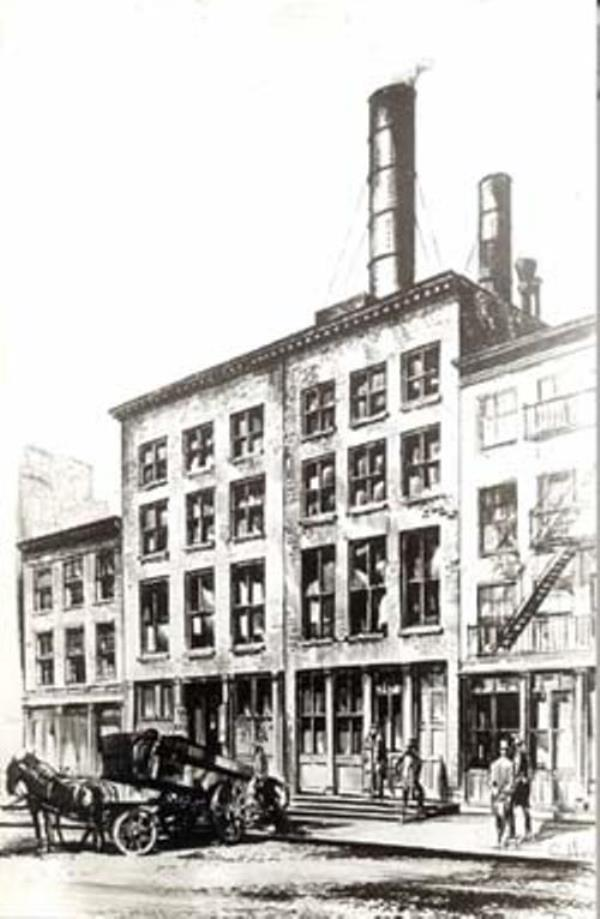
A sketch of the Pearl Street Station

On September 4, 1882, Edison's first central station, the Pearl Street Station, opened at 257 Pearl Street in Manhattan. The station was the first commercial power plant in the United States, and was the world's first cogeneration plant. The plant burned down on January 2, 1890. Only 1 dynamo (or generator) survived; it is currently displayed at the Henry Ford Museum. The Institute of Electrical and Electronics Engineers designated it as a milestone in 2011.

=== Other stations ===
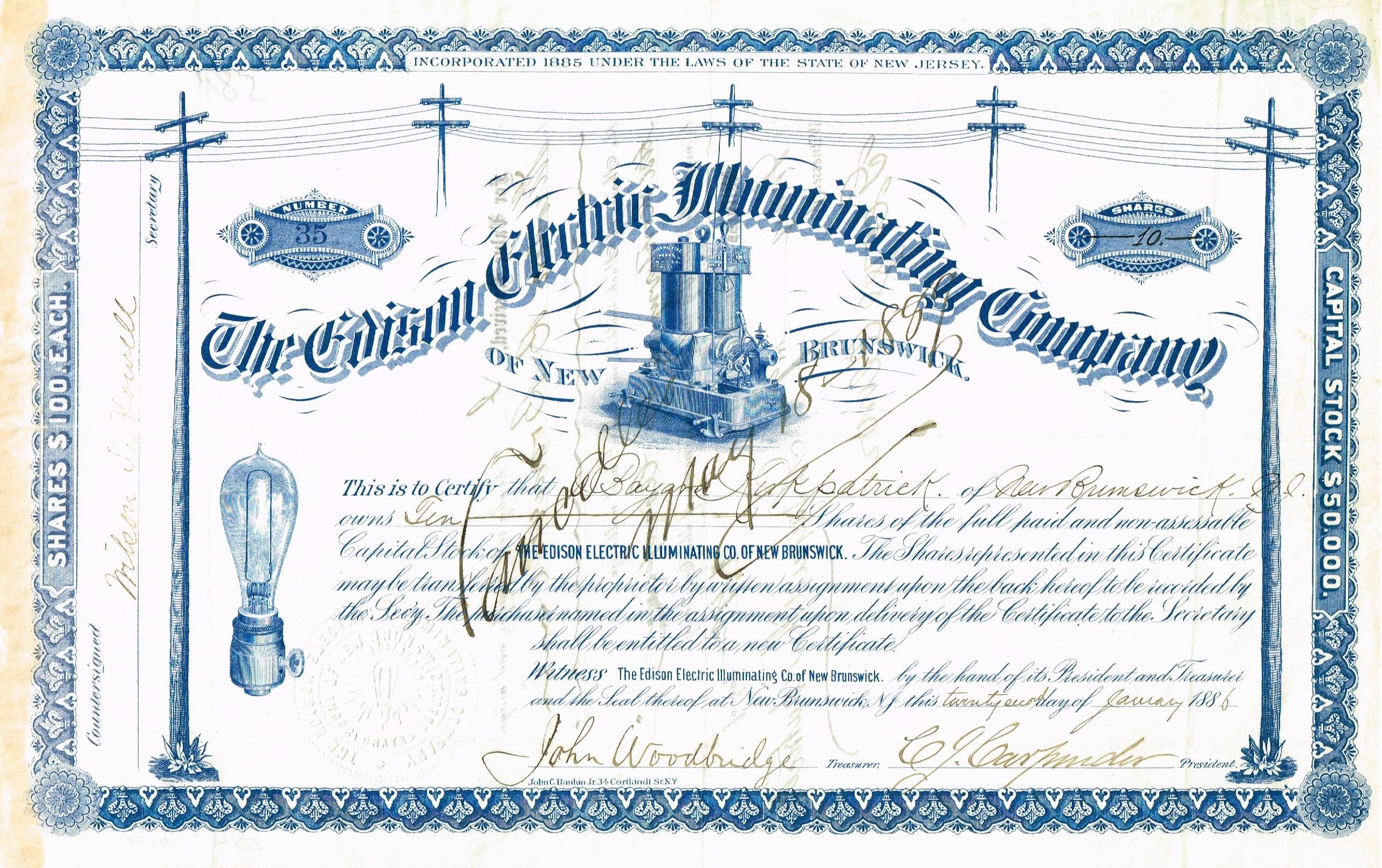
Share of the Edison Electric Illuminating Company of New Brunswick, issued 26. January 1886

In November 1882, the Edison Electric Illuminating Company of Shamokin, Pennsylvania was established. In 1883, it became only the second three-wire electrical station in the world. The first was Edison's plant in Sunbury, Pennsylvania, which opened on July 4, 1883. The opening ceremony was attended by Edison himself. Even today, Edison's presence is remembered throughout the town, with the Edison Hotel and a monument just outside Sunbury. On October 1, 1883, the Brockton Edison Electric Illuminating Company Power Station, another three-wire plant, opened in Brockton, Massachusetts and was capable of supplying about 1600 lamps. The Brockton station is listed in the National Register of Historic Places. On November 17, 1883, the Edison Electric Illuminating Company of Mount Carmel, Pennsylvania was founded. This was the first isolated electrical plant in the world, meaning that the entirety of Mount Carmel was powered by electricity. 38 arc lamps and 50 incandescent light bulbs were erected in the downtown business district. Edison also opened plants in Fall River, Massachusetts (1883), Cumberland, Maryland (1884), Tamaqua, Pennsylvania (1885), and Boston (1886).

=== Fate ===
The Edison Illuminating Company was purchased by Consolidated Gas in 1901. In 1936, with electricity sales far outpacing gas sales, the company changed its name to Consolidated Edison. Today, Con Ed is a multi-billion dollar company that provides power to around 3.3 million people. Occasionally, it is misreported that the Edison Illuminating Company later became General Electric; however, they were never related aside from their common founder.

== Notable employees ==
In 1891, Henry Ford became an engineer with the Edison Illuminating Company, and was promoted to chief engineer in 1893. He left the company on August 15, 1899, to focus on automobile manufacturing. James Hood Wright was a board member of the company.

== Sources ==
- Railway World (1894). Railway World.
