= Frank L. Sweetser =

- Born: June 2, 1873; Wilton, New Hampshire, United States
- Died: December 17, 1953 (aged 80)
- Occupations: Management consultant, business executive, and organizational theorist
- Known for: Pioneer in management consultancy and organizational theory
- Spouse: Lura Hill Parker (m. 1897)
- Children: 3

Frank Loel Sweetser (June 2, 1873 – December 17, 1953) was an American pioneer management consultant, business executive, and organizational theorist.

He was general manager of the Dutchess Manufacturing Company, and served as president of the American Management Association, and of the National Association of Cost Accountants, now Institute of Management Accountants.

== Early life ==
Sweetser was born in 1873 in Wilton, New Hampshire, son of Harrison Cole Sweetser, a traveling salesman, and Abby Ann (Walton) Sweetser.

== Career ==
Sweetser came into prominence early 1920s as author of a series articles on cost accounting, published in the System magazine. In those years he served as general manager of the Dutchess Manufacturing Company, a trouser manufacturers at Poughkeepsie, New York.

In 1925 Sweetser was elected president of the American Management Association for 1927 at their recent annual meeting, as successor of Sam A. Lewisohn and was in 1928 succeeded by William W. Kincaid. In 1927 he also served as new chairman of the International Garments Manufacturers' Association, and in the year 1928-29 he served as president of the National Association of Cost Accountants.

In 1930 Sweetser became partner in the consulting firm of Stevenson, Harrison & Jordan, and later senior partner. He also became partner in the National Photo Laboratories.

== Family and death ==
Sweetser married Lura Hill Parker on June 22, 1897, and they had 3 children and lived in Montclair, New Jersey. Sweetser died on December 27, 1953, in New York City at the age of 79 after a brief illness.

His son, Frank L. Sweetser Jr. (1913–1994), became a notable sociologist, at the department of sociology at the Indiana University.

== Selected publications ==
- Frank L. Sweetser. Financial management of the Dutchess Manufacturing Company, 1925.
- Paul W. Herring, F. L. Sweetser, Joseph M. Meyers. Following Up Complaints and Errors. American Management Association Office executives' division. Committee on salary standardization, 1925.

Articles, a selection

- Sweetser, F. L., "Things We Learned from Making Over a Business," System, November, 1923.
- Sweetser, F. L., "Why Our Labor Costs Are Low," System, December, 1923.
- Sweetser, F. L., "Coaching Our Workers to Meet 1924 Labor Costs," System, February, 1924.
- Frank L. Sweetser. "Operationg data for line officials." in: Handbook Of Business Administration, Leona Powell (ed.). 1931. p. 681-702
- Frank L. Sweetser. "Essentials in Budgeting." in: Handbook Of Business Administration, Leona Powell (ed.). 1931. p. 1536-1554
- Sweetser, F. L. 1937. "Standard costs simplified for garment manufacturers." N.A.C.A. Bulletin (August 1): 1309–1330.
