= Brockton Edison Electric Illuminating Company Power Station =

- U.S. National Register of Historic Places
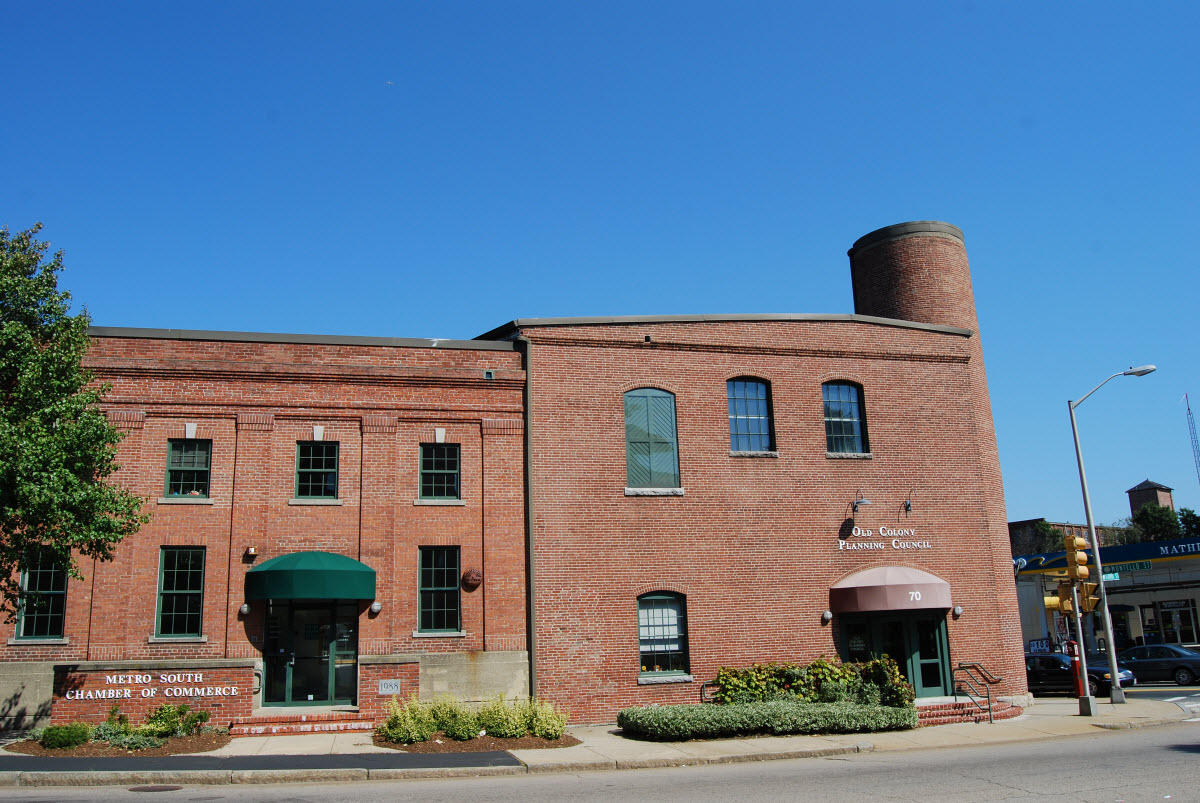

- Location within Massachusetts Location within the United States
- Location: Brockton, Massachusetts
- Coordinates: 42°04′57.2″N 71°01′2.6″W
- Built: 1883
- Architect: Frank J. Sprague
- NRHP reference No.: 87000874
- Added to NRHP: September 17, 1987

Brockton Edison Electric Illuminating Company Power Station or "Brockton Edison Company - Old Power Station" is a historic power plant at 70 School Street in Brockton, Massachusetts. It was one of the earliest power plants built by Thomas Edison.

The plant opened on October 1, 1883. It contained three "H" dynamos capable of powering about 1600 lamps.

The Brockton plant was soon followed by others in Lawrence and Fall River, Massachusetts, and Newburgh, New York.

It was added to the National Register of Historic Places in 1987.

== See also ==
- Edison Illuminating Company
- National Register of Historic Places listings in Plymouth County, Massachusetts
