= Spirella =

Corset manufacturing company

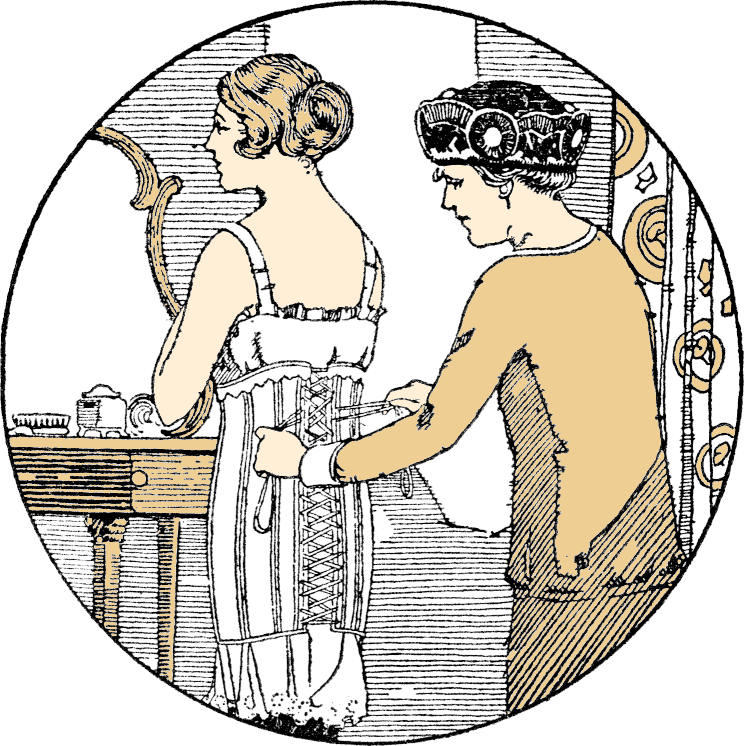
Advertisement drawing of a Spirella corsetier delivering and adjusting in a customer's home.

The name Spirella refers to the Spirella Stay which was invented by Marcus Merritt Beeman in the US in 1904 and made from tightly twisted and flattened coils of wire. The founders were Beeman, William Wallace Kincaid and Jesse Homan Pardee.

== Origins ==
The Spirella name was used by the Spirella Corset Company Inc that was founded in 1904 in Meadville, Pennsylvania, US. It was founded on a patent of dressbone, for bustles, but started corset manufacture in 1904. The company manufactured made-to-measure corsets. Benefits for the company's employees included travel, education and health care.

=== United Kingdom ===
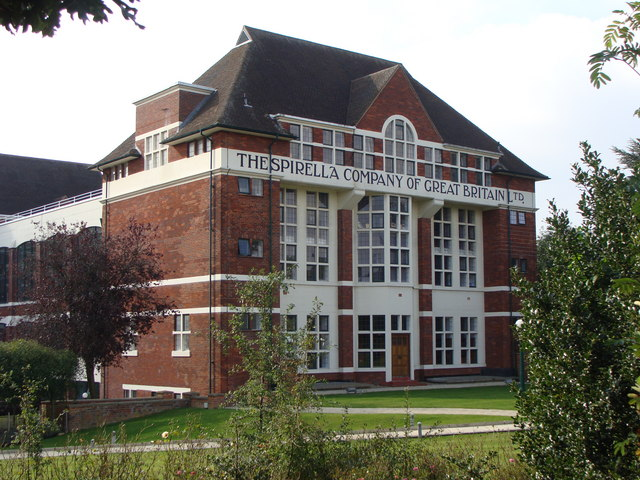
The Spirella Building in Letchworth

The UK subsidiary was The Spirella Company of Great Britain. Spirella co-founder and entrepreneur William Wallace Kincaid commissioned the architect Cecil Hignett to design a state-of-the art factory of architectural beauty. The design included embellishments in Arts & Crafts styling. This factory, the Spirella Building, was built and expanded in stages between 1912 and 1920. During World War II, the Irvin Airchute Company expanded its production of parachutes into the Spirella Building and women working for the British Tabulating Machine Company secretly produced components for the decoding machines called Bombes. In September 1957, the company ceased to be under the control of the US firm.

The company's most popular corset was the Model 305. Spirella products were not sold in shops. Instead, female staff called corsetiers (or corsetières) were sent to customers' homes. After an ill-fated attempt to market garments of "Stub-tex", a form of Gore-Tex being used under licence from W. L. Gore & Associates, the company was sold in 1985 to the rival Spencers of Banbury and finally closed in July 1989.

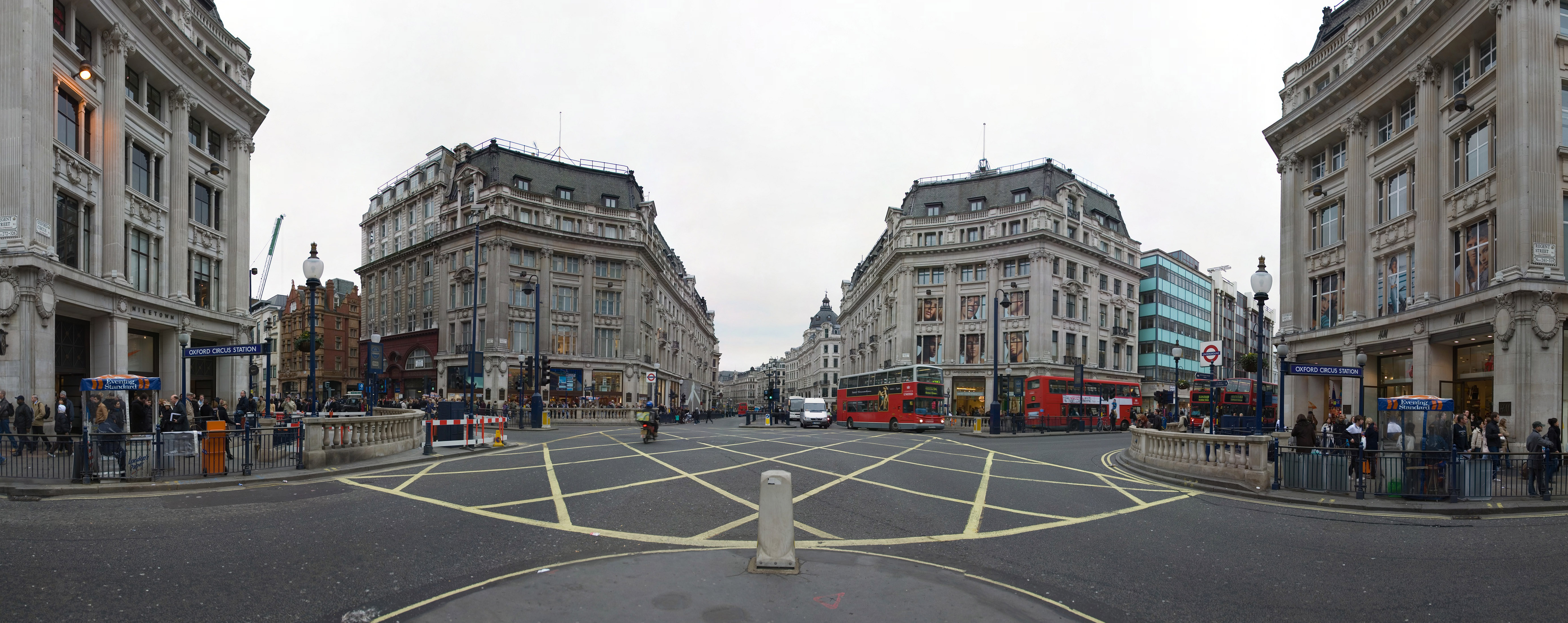
A 180-degree panoramic view of Oxford Circus, looking south down Regent Street. Spirella House is the second building from the left fronting onto the circus.

The Spirella Building was designed to provide workers with a highly productive and pleasant environment that focused on the comfort of factory employees. Referred to as the "factory of beauty", it offered a wide array of employee amenities including "baths, showers, gymnastics classes, a library, free eye tests and bicycle repairs". In 1979 it was Grade II* listed. The Letchworth Garden City Foundation bought the neglected building in 1995, restored the interior and re-opened it for leased office accommodation. It currently houses over twenty businesses.

== Locations ==
At its height the company had factories in the US (Meadville, Pennsylvania, New Haven, Connecticut, and Lincoln Nebraska ), in Canada (in 1910), in the UK (in 1910; from 1912 in the Spirella Building in Letchworth) and in Sweden (Malmö) in 1920 and Niagara Falls, New York (in 1917). Their flagship location was Spirella House on Oxford Circus, London. A factory built in 1910 in Niagara falls, Ontario, eventually became the premises of the Bird Kingdom Tropical Adventure.

== Archival collections ==
A number of organisations have collected archival examples of documents and objects related to the Spirella Factory. The Garden City Collection in Letchworth includes over forty objects and documents in its collection. Additionally, collections are maintained by Hertfordshire's Community Archives Network. Archival examples include: the Castle Corset cartoon and an advertisement for the Spirella War Savings Association.
