= Hendershot =

The Hendershot surname has its roots in the German surname Hinneschied, which can also be spelled as Hinderschied or Hinterschied. It is believed that Hinneschied originated from the surname Hayderschatte, which was created when Micheal Hayder and Charlotte Schatte combined their last names after marriage. Subsequently, their son, Wilhelm, changed the family surname to Hinneschied. Prior to their migration to America, the Hendershots resided in the Rhineland-Palatinate region of Germany. The original farmhouse of the Hinneschieds still stands today.

Johann Micheal Hendershot (1674–1749) was the first of his family to migrate to America, settling in Tewksbury Township, New Jersey, along with his family on June 13, 1710. The Hendershot family home in Tewksbury Township, New Jersey, known as Hohenhaus or 'High House,' is still extant. It is believed that all Hendershots in the United States and North America can trace their lineage back to Johann and his family. As of September 2022, the Hendershot surname was borne by 7,453 individuals, making it the 5369th most common last name. Hendershots are dispersed throughout the United States, with a significant concentration in states such as Ohio, Virginia, Indiana, Pennsylvania, and Michigan.

== Notable people with the surname include ==
- Fred Hendershot (1895–1977), American football player and coach
- Heather Hendershot, American historian
- Larry Hendershot (1944–2018), American football player
- Peyton Hendershot (born 1999), American football player
- Robert Henry Hendershot, American Civil War drummer
- Sara Hendershot (born 1988), American rower

Fictional characters:

- Sylas Hendershot, in The Final Storm
- Bubba Hendershot, in Maximum Overdrive
- William Hendershot, alias used by William Munny in Unforgiven

== See also ==
- Hendershott
- List of most common surnames in North America
