= Arthur Williams (electrical engineer) =

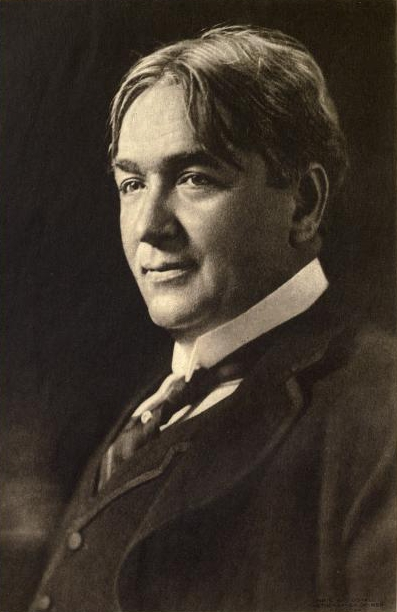
Arthur Williams (1868-1937)

Arthur Williams (August 14, 1868 – April 14, 1937) was an American electrical engineer and an executive at the New York Edison Company, a Federal Food Administrator of the City of New York, a local politician in Roslyn Harbor, New York, and the first president of The National Association of Corporation Schools in 1913.

== Biography ==
=== Youth and early career ===
Williams was born in Norfolk, Virginia in 1868, the son of Rev. Christopher S. and Hannah Sanford (Rogers) Williams. He was educated in the public and private schools of Hartford, Connecticut, and New York City.

At the age of sixteen, in 1882, he began his business career with an electrical contractor. He remained in this position from August, 1884, until February, 1885, when he became an employee of the Edison Electric Illuminating Company of New York, which was succeeded by the New York Edison Company.

At Edison, Williams was assigned to duty as assistant in the chemical meter department. From this period his advancement was rapid, due to his speedy grasp of conditions and the energy he displayed. He was made superintendent of interior construction in 1887, and was electrician of the company until 1888, when he was advanced to the position of superintendent of the underground department, general inspector in 1890 and general agent in 1893.

=== Later career and connections ===
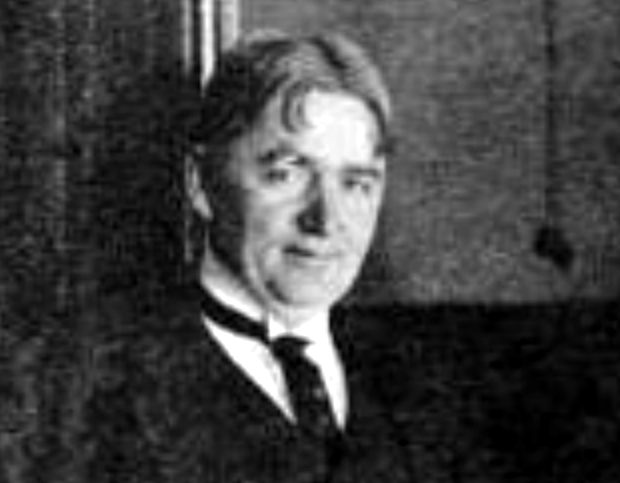
Williams in Murray's office, 1908

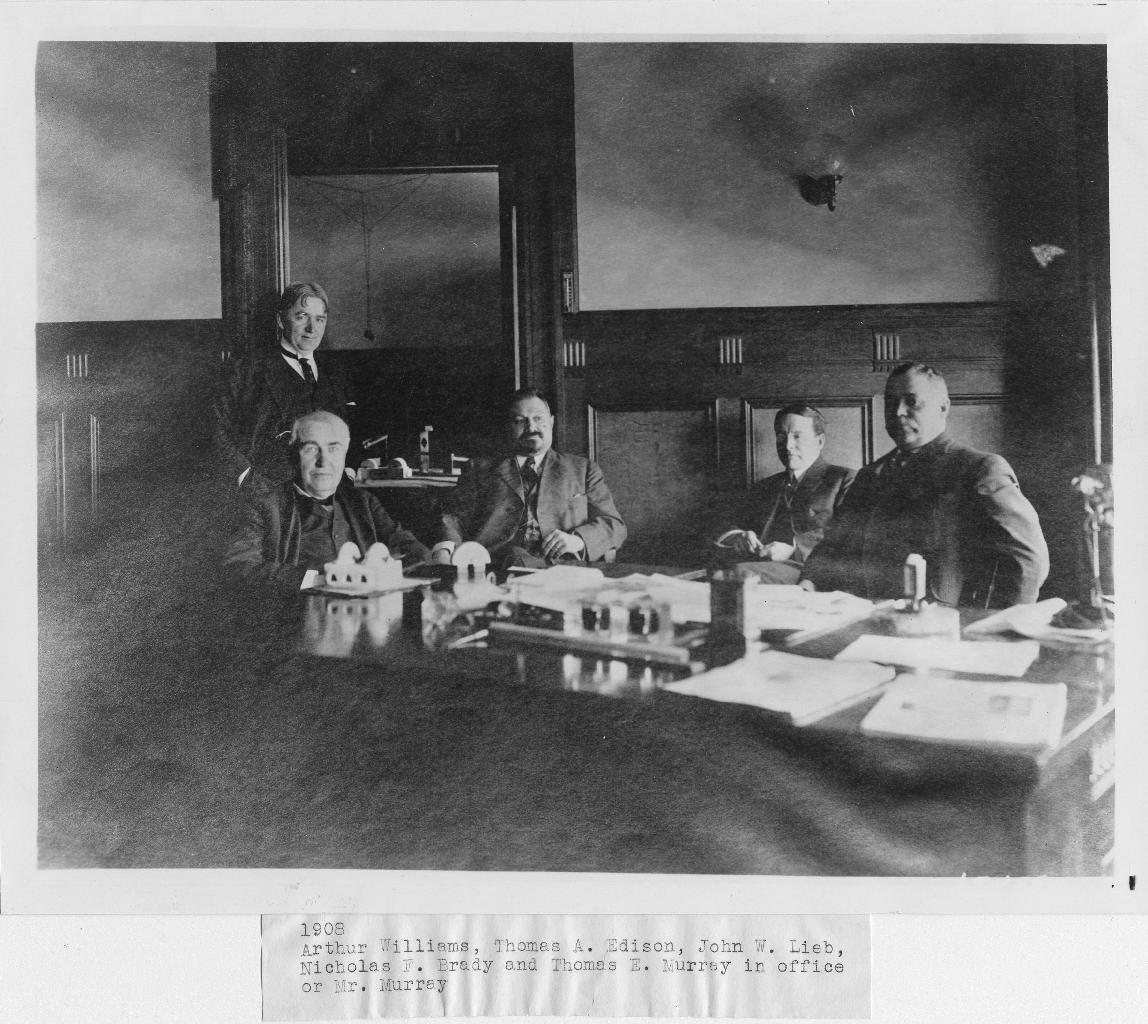
Arthur Williams, Thomas A. Edison, John W. Lieb, Nicholas F. Brady, and Thomas E. Murray in the office of Mr. Murray, 1908

In 1915 at the New York Edison Company, Williams was made the general commercial manager. By 1931 Williams was vice president of the New York Edison Company.

At the outbreak of the Spanish–American War, Williams was in charge of the Volunteer Forces which mined New York harbor. This work was done under the direction of the regular army, and he commanded a volunteer electrical force organized from members of local electrical companies. He served under Colonel William Ludlow, who was in charge of fortifications and torpedo defenses at Sandy Hook, and Major Henry M. Adams, who occupied a similar position at Forts Wadsworth and Hamilton. Williams always took an active part in accident prevention, a work carried on under the direction of the American Museum of Safety, of which he was president, and was deeply interested in various charity and philanthropic organizations.

His connections with commercial enterprises were many and varied. He was president of the Electrical Show Company, New York; of the Electric Garage Corporation, New York; of the Electric Vehicle Association; and of the Edison Savings and Loan Association. He was vice president of the Yonkers Electric Light & Power Company, and director of the Metropolitan Life Insurance Company, and the Morris Plan of New York. He was a director of the New York Association for the Blind, Chrystie Street House, Upanin Club of Brooklyn, Municipal Art Society, National Employment Exchange, and the National Safety Council.

Other societies in which Mr. Williams held membership included the American Institute of Electrical Engineers, of which he is a Fellow; the New York Electrical Society (past president), the Electric Vehicle Association of America (past president), the National Electric Light Association (past president), the Illuminating Engineers' Society, Association of Edison Illuminating Companies (past president in 1912–1914), The National Association of Corporation Schools (past-president), the Technical Publicity Association, American Association for the Advancement of Science, American Society of Political and Social Science, Municipal Art Society, Metropolitan Museum of Art, Society for the Protection of the Adirondacks, Electro -Chemical Society, International Engineering Congress, New York Zoological Society, Broadway Association, Chamber of Commerce of the State of New York, New England Society, International Law Association, of London, England.

Williams also served as a local politician in the Village of Roslyn Harbor, New York – the community in which he resided – from the time of its 1931 incorporation until his 1937 death.

=== Death ===
Williams died on April 14, 1937 in Miami Beach, Florida, aged 68.

== Awards and honors ==
For the interest Mr. Williams had shown in French affairs, the government of that country decorated him as an officer de la L'lnstruction Publique – and, for his work in connection with the American Museum of Safety, the King of Spain made him a Knight of the Royal Order of Isabel the Catholic.

== Personal life ==
At the time of his death, Williams resided at his estate, Brooks Corners, in Roslyn Harbor, New York.
