= Electric Vehicle Association of America =

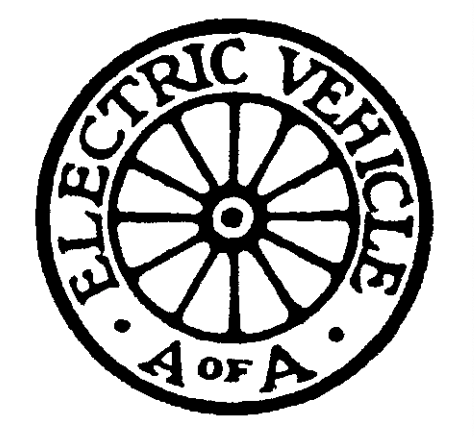
- EVAA Logo
- Successor: National Electric Light Association Electric Vehicle Section
- Formation: October 8, 1910; 116 years ago
- Founder: Arthur Williams; William H. Blood Jr.
- Founded at: New York City, U.S.
- Dissolved: March 10, 1916; 110 years ago
- Type: Association
- Headquarters: New York City, New York
- Region served: North America
- Services: Publication: The Central Station
- Fields: Electric vehicles Electric Industry
- Members: 11,000 (1921)
- President: Yearly Term
- Key people: Frank W. Smith; John F. Gilchrist

The Electric Vehicle Association of America (EVAA) was established in 1910 to facilitate co-operation in improving the public understanding of electric vehicles. It was founded on the initiative of Arthur Williams. It existed as an independent organization until 1916 when it was absorbed by the National Electric Light Association (NELA) of which it became the Electric Vehicle Section.

When Williams first proposed the project on 6 May 1910 to a group of engineers involved in the industry, the original conception was of an organization local to New York, where Williams was based. However, when the matter was raised at the 1910 convention of NELA, at which it was decided that a national organization was what was needed.

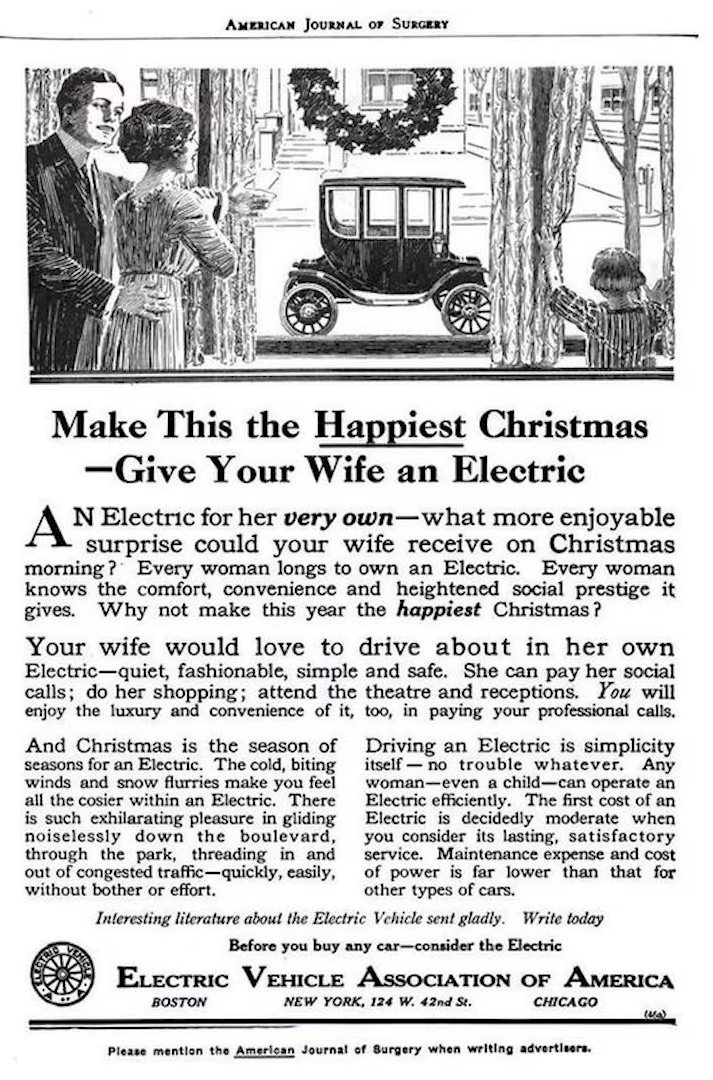
Newspaper advertisement

== Presidents of the EVAA ==
- 1910-1912 William H. Blood, Jr.
- 1912-1913 Arthur Williams
- 1913-1914 Frank W. Smith
- 1914-1915 John F. Gilchrist
- 1915-1916 W. H. Johnson

Edward S. Mansfield, of the Boston Edison Company, became chairman of the Electrical Vehicle Section of the NELA.
