= Operation Enterprise =

Operation Enterprise can mean:

- Operation Enterprise (training program), a high school and college student program sponsored by the American Management Association
- Operation Enterprise (Vietnam War), a U.S. Army pacification and security operation that took place in Long An Province, lasting from February 13, 1967 to March 11, 1968
