= American Management Association =

Professional membership association

- Predecessor: The National Association of Corporation Schools et al.
- Formation: 1923; 103 years ago
- Type: not-for-profit membership organization
- Headquarters: New York City, U.S.
- Region served: Worldwide
- Members: 25,000 members and 3,000 organizations in 90 countries
- Official language: English
- President: Manny Avramidis
- Website: www.amanet.org

The American Management Association (AMA) is an American non-profit educational membership organization for the promotion of management, based in New York City. Besides its headquarters there, it has local head offices throughout the world.

It offers its members a wide range of training programs, seminars, conferences, studies, and publications, which cover topics as diverse as industrial or commercial management, artificial intelligence, communication, finance and accounting, human resources management, leadership, international management, marketing and sales.

The AMA conducts professional development seminars and training programs year-round for public- and private-sector organizations at more than 40 locations across the United States and Canada, covering subjects such as leadership, communication, project management, strategic planning, and human resources.

== History ==
=== Origins ===
The origins of the American Management Association dates back to the beginning of the 20th century, when the training of industrial workers became a concern for large American companies. In 1913, 35 of the most important professional schools, led by the New York Edison Company, joined forces to create The National Association of Corporation Schools (NACS).

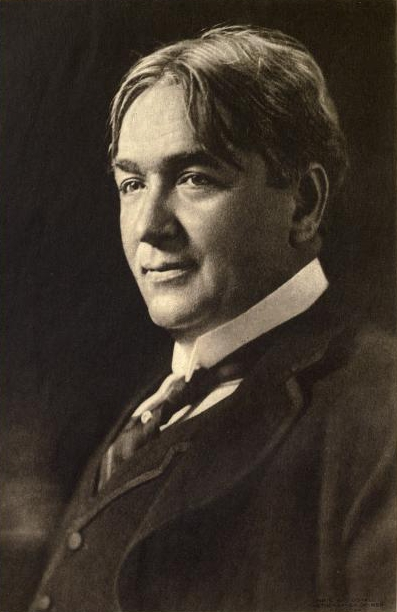
Arthur Williams, first president of NACS, 1913.

It came to life at a convention held at the New York University on January 24, 1913, at which a constitution was adopted, officers were elected and provision were made for the appointment of working committees.

As first president was elected Arthur Williams, an electrical engineer and executive at the New York Edison Company, as first vice-president E. St. Elmo Lewis, as second vice-president Charles Proteus Steinmetz, as secretary Lee Galloway, and as treasurer E. J. Mehren. Frederick C. Henderschott was elected assistant secretary-treasurer.

The first national convention of the association was held in September that year in Dayton, Ohio, under the auspices of the National Cash Register Company. In the first year already 30+ major corporations had joined, with in total over 500.000 employees.

Under the influence of Taylor's methods, the aim of the association was to promote vocational training as a factor in the competitiveness of industrial activity. After the First World War, The National Association of Corporation Schools moved closer to another recently created association, the Employment Managers' Association.

The Employment Managers' Association was in 1920 reorganized into the Industrial Relations Association of America, which in 1922 merged with The National Association of Corporation Schools to form the National Personnel Association.

=== Early years ===
In 1923 the association changed its name into the current American Management Association. Some of the founders of the American Management Association were Meyer Bloomfield, Henry S. Dennison, William J. Graham and the first president Sam A. Lewisohn (1884–1951).

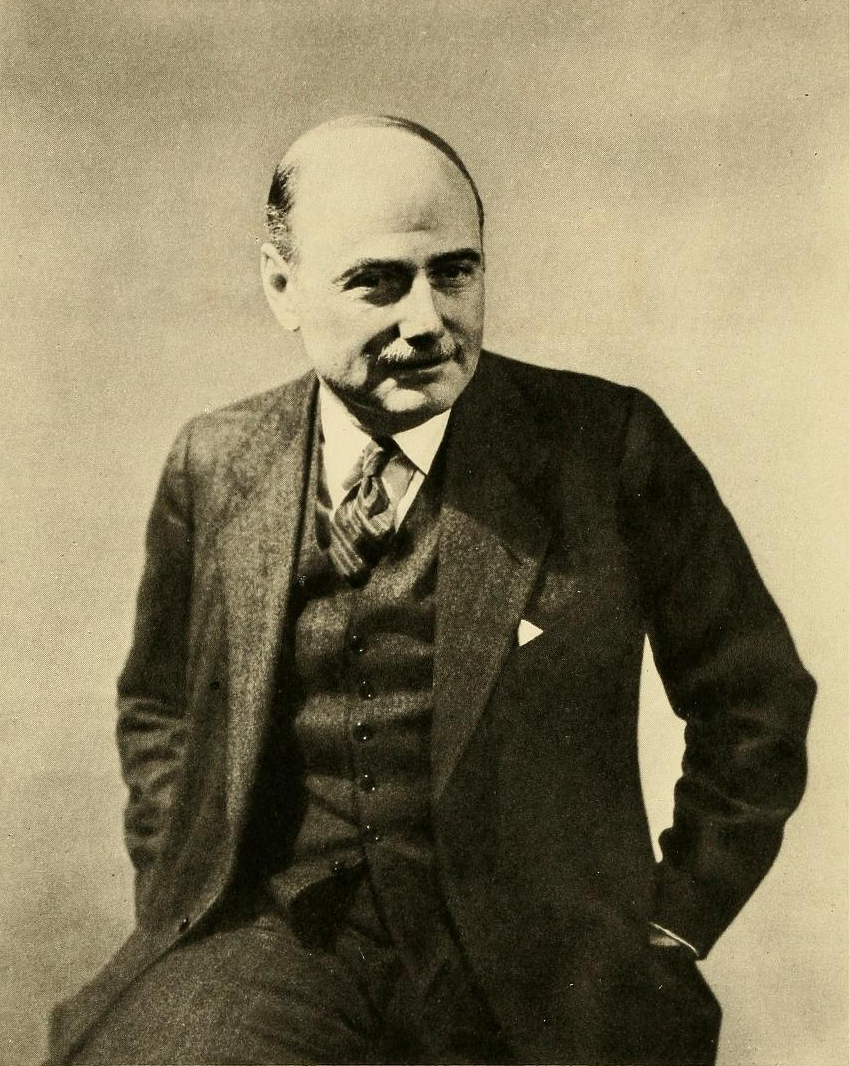
Sam A. Lewisohn, first AMA president in 1923–26.

At the end of the war, there were movements in industry to spread socialist ideals and to revive trade unionism. The American Management Association made it their mission to help managers manage social relations in order to cope with them. However, with the Great Depression of 1929, the American Management Association adopted more progressive positions to limit direct policy interventions in the management of enterprises.

With World War II the American Management Association began to advocate greater equality of treatment at work. In 1942, it published a study that called for better integration of black workers into the world of work. In 1943 it published a similar study on women's work. During these war years the American Management Association brought together a large number of business leaders, and was very close to the political power. The American Management Association Vice-President Lawrence A. Appley was one of the directors of the War Manpower Commission.

After the war the influence of American Management Association remained high, and they successively published recommendations on the quality of financial reporting in 1946, and on cooperation with the trade unions in 1948. By the time Lawrence A. Appley started his presidency, in 1948, the American Management Association offered a forum for debates, a network of influence, and a platform for the leaders in the training of business leaders.

=== Further developments ===
Throughout the 1950s, the American Management Association continued to link the world of big business with government. It was in 1961 that it began its international expansion with the opening of a European center in Brussels. It then opened one in Mexico City in 1966, Canada in 1974, Japan in 1993, Shanghai in 1995 and Latin America in 1996. During this period, several centers were also established in the United States in Atlanta, Chicago, San Francisco and Washington, DC.

In 1963, the American Management Association established the Operation Enterprise, a program designed for high school and college students. From the 1960s on, it also increased its editorial activity and created a publishing house, Amacom, in 1963. In 1972, it founded a newspaper, Organizational Dynamics, and launched a second in 2000, MWorld. The American Management Association sold Amacom to HarperCollins in 2018.

To date, the American Management Association has 25,000 members and 3,000 organizations in 90 countries. The current President and CEO of the American Management Association is Manny Avramidis.

== Past presidents ==
Presidents of the American Management Association, and some notable other functions, have been:

- 1923–26: Sam A. Lewisohn, first president.
- 1927 : Frank L. Sweetser
- 1928 : William W. Kincaid
- 1929 : Cyrus S. Ching
- 1930–33 : William Joseph Graham
- 1934–36: Malcolm C. Rorty
- 1936–48: Alvin E. Dodd; James O. McKinsey, chairman, 1936–37.
- 1948–68 : Lawrence A. Appley.
- 1968 : Alexander Trowbridge
- 1968–70 : James Keith Louden
- 1971–81 : James L. Hayes.
- 1982–90 : Thomas R. Horton
- 1991–97: David Fagiano.
- 1998–00: George B. Weathersby
- 2000–01: Barry Lawson Williams (interim) and CEO
- 2001–17 : Edward T. Reilly.

In 2017 Manny Avramidis was named 18th President and Chief Executive of the American Management Association.

== See also ==
- Henry Laurence Gantt Medal
