= Edward S. Mansfield =

American electrical engineer involved in the development of electric vehicles

Edward Stacey Mansfield (11 November 1870 – 1952) was an American electrical engineer involved in the early development of electric vehicles.

Edward was born in Wakefield, Massachusetts, the son of Edward Galen Mansfield and Rebecca Stacey Breed.

He attended Wakefield High School from which he graduated in 1889.

He settled in Boston and was appointed head of education for the Boston Edison Company.

Following the merger of the Electric Vehicle Association of America into the National Electric Light Association (NELA), Mansfield became the Chairman of NELA's Electric Vehicle Section.

== Family life ==
He married Elizabeth O. Bancroft on 14 June 1905 at the First Unitarian Church, Peabody, Massachusetts. They had two children Edward Bancroft Mansfield and Eleanor Porter Mansfield.
