= Helen Blanchard =

American inventor (1840–1922)

Helen Augusta Blanchard
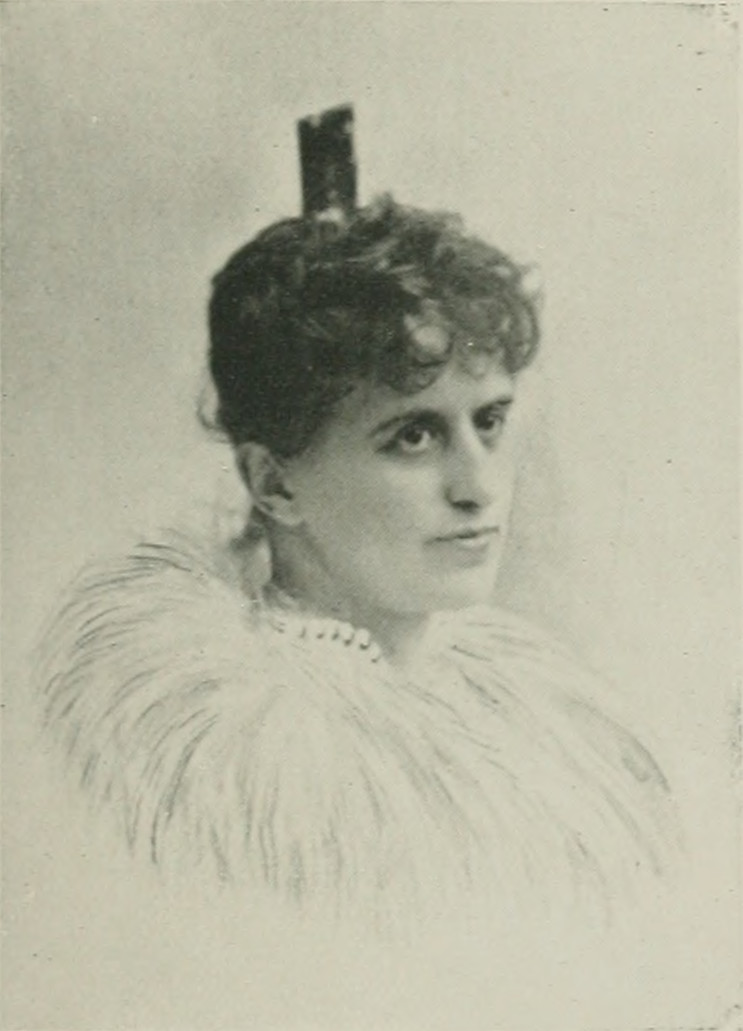
- Helen Augusta Blanchard. Source: Willard and Livermore, American Women, Mast, Crowell & Kirkpatrick, 1897, 97
- Born: October 25, 1840; Portland, Maine
- Died: January 12, 1922 (aged 81); Providence, Rhode Island

Helen Augusta Blanchard (25 October 1840 – January 12, 1922) was an American inventor who received 28 patents between 1873 and 1915. She was known for her numerous inventions dealing with sewing machines and sewing technology.

== Early life ==
Blanchard was born in Portland, Maine on October 25, 1840 to a wealthy family. Her father was Nathaniel Blanchard, a shipowner and businessman; her mother was Phoebe Buxton Blanchard. Helen was one of six children; two other daughters Louise Phobe, and Persis E., and three sons David H., Augustus, and Albus.

For much of her young life Blanchard remained in Portland with her family. Her father ran a successful business until 1866 when there was a financial panic and also much of Portland burned to the ground. After the failure of her father's business she moved to Boston, presumably on her own, to pursue a career as an inventor.

Blanchard demonstrated an inventive turn of mind at an early age, but there is no indication that she received any mechanical or technical education, despite her patents being involved mostly in these subjects.

== First inventions and move to Boston – 1870s ==
Her father suffered financial losses as a result of the business panic of 1866, resulting in the loss of the family homestead. He then died, leaving his family with financial troubles.

As a result, Helen Blanchard and her family sold their ancestral home at the corner of High St. and Pleasant St., west side. She moved to Boston, Massachusetts and patented several inventions relating to sewing machines in 1873 and 1875. The most important of her inventions was likely Patent No. 141987, an improvement in sewing machines that introduced the buttonhole stitch. This included the Blanchard over-seaming-machine, which could simultaneously sew and trim knitted fabrics. Notably, she had to borrow money to help pay for the development and filing of her first few patents.

The majority of her inventions were designed to be used in commercial settings, and it would be over 60 years before another inventor came along to revolutionize the in-home sewing machine to the same extent that Blanchard was able to change commercial operations.

== Philadelphia and New York – late 1870s–1890s ==
After developing techniques for zigzag stitching and over seaming, Blanchard moved to Philadelphia, where she established the Blanchard Overseaming Company of Philadelphia to market her inventions in 1881. She also founded the Blanchard Hosiery Machine Company in 1882.

After her success in Boston, she was able to pay back the loans she had taken to develop her first few inventions. Later, she would go on to use the proceeds from her profitable ventures in Philadelphia to repurchase the property in Maine that her family sold after her father's death.

She moved to New York in the early 1890s, and continued to patent a variety of inventions, including a pencil sharpener and a hat sewing machine.

== Later life and legacy ==
Blanchard moved back to the family property in Portland in 1901. There, she continued to patent inventions until suffering a stroke in 1916. She died in Providence, Rhode Island, in 1922 and is buried in the family plot in Portland's Evergreen Cemetery. It is unclear what became of her property and wealth after her death. However, she was inducted into the National Inventors Hall of Fame in 2006.

Notably, one of her zig-zag sewing machines is now on display in the Smithsonian National Museum of American History in Washington, DC. This was considered one of her most important inventions and revolutionized the way that commercial sewing was done for over half of a century.

== Patents ==
Helen Blanchard received 28 patents over about 45 years, 22 of which involved sewing and sewing machines. Many of these inventions have been referenced by other inventors in their own designs.

1873-Improvement in Sewing Machines

- This invention created a way to form a buttonhole stitch, or a zig-zag stitch, that when used to close a seam gave strength to the piece. The stitch could be varied in several different ways, such as varying the depth of the needle. The original sewing machine with this adaptation is currently housed in the Smithsonian National Museum of American History.

1875- Improvement in Elastic Seams for Garments

- This invention is a method of stitching that produces a strong elastic stitch with minimal alterations to the material used in the process besides adjusting the tension of the fabric.

1875- Improvement in Elastic Goring for Shoes

- This invention is a way to strengthen shoes by reinforcing the goring keeping the pieces of shoe together. A series of rows of stitches made from one strand of regular thread and one rubber thread is used to create a type of goring that could withstand more movement compared to the previous method.

1876- Improvement in Welted and Covered Seams

- This invention is a method for which two edges of material, once stitched together to form a seam, could be made flat. This could be done by either inserting a welt or by sewing a strip over the seam.

1882- Hollow Sewing Needle

- This invention is a hollow sewing needle designed to hold a significant amount of thread in the needle itself for easier delivery. In her patent application she noted that many of the techniques she is using in this invention are not new, such as coiling in wire or hats, but that they have never been applied to sewing before.
- The primary invention here is "a method of filling a hollow needle with a coil of thread which consists in winding the thread on a flexible core to form a bobbin, inserting the bobbin in the hollow needle, and then withdrawing the flexible core, leaving the coil of thread therein, substantially as described."

1883- Spool Case

- This invention is a simple cover for spools of silk, cotton, thread, or other material, that protects the spool from becoming dirty, damaged, or unwound.
- Her patent also claims that "accidental unwinding of the thread from the spool is prevented by the cover, and when a number of spools are placed together in a workbasket or other receptacle the entangling of threads is prevented". This helped to address a large issue for seamstresses at the time. The solution is quite simple yet effective.

1893- Method of Securing Reeds or Cords to the Edges of Material

- This invention is a method of securing reeds or cords to the edges of materials, especially securing reeds to hat sweatbands. This is done by folding the edges of the material around the reed or cord before sewing.

1893- Sewing-Needle

- This invention is an improvement to the sewing needle, by making it possible to thread the needle with one hand for efficiency. This is done by adding a latch that allows the needle to open, making it possible for the user to place the thread in the slot instead of threading it through a hole.
- The patent also mentions applicability to the medical profession - needles used to apply stitches.

1894- Surgical Needle

- This invention is an improvement to previous surgical needles. The needle has a lancet point which allows it to pierce skin easily with minimal resistance and therefore less pain to the patient. The notch on the backside of the needle allows the thread to disconnect from the needle by just withdrawing from the skin.

1898 - Improvements to Sewing Needles and Machines

- This invention provides for some improvements to existing needle and sewing machine technology. The sewing needle includes a slot open at one side, the walls of said slow being formed at their upper ends to engage the thread during the downward movement of the need and at their lower ends to release the thread during the upward movement of the needle and a spring secured to the shank of the needle and extending across the mouth of the slot." In short, the invention allows for more efficient sewing by simplifying the motion required by the sewing machine.

1900- Sewing Machine Needle

- This invention is a type of needle used in sewing machines where one or more thread is used to form stitches. The needle has the ability to pierce the goods to be sewed, and contains a notch that supplies another thread to create the stitch.

1901- Seam for Sewed Articles

- This invention is a way to connect two edges of material, specifically knit fabrics, and over edging. This method uses a series of loops made from a single thread going through the two edges of the material to create a seam.

1901- Hat Sewing Machine

- This invention is an adaptation to the sewing machine that allows it to stitch a common chain stitch with one thread to be used to sew sweatbands and strips of linen onto the inside edge of the hat. Previously, this work had been done by hand, so this machine increased the rate of production by simplifying the work needed to be done.

1914- Method of Selvage-Sewing

- This invention is a method for primarily bringing together the edges of selvage knit goods, but can also be used with other fabric for decorative uses. This method helps smooth out curls in fabric and helps create a flat seam that was not previously possible.

== See also ==
- Margaret E. Knight
