= Boston Edison Company =

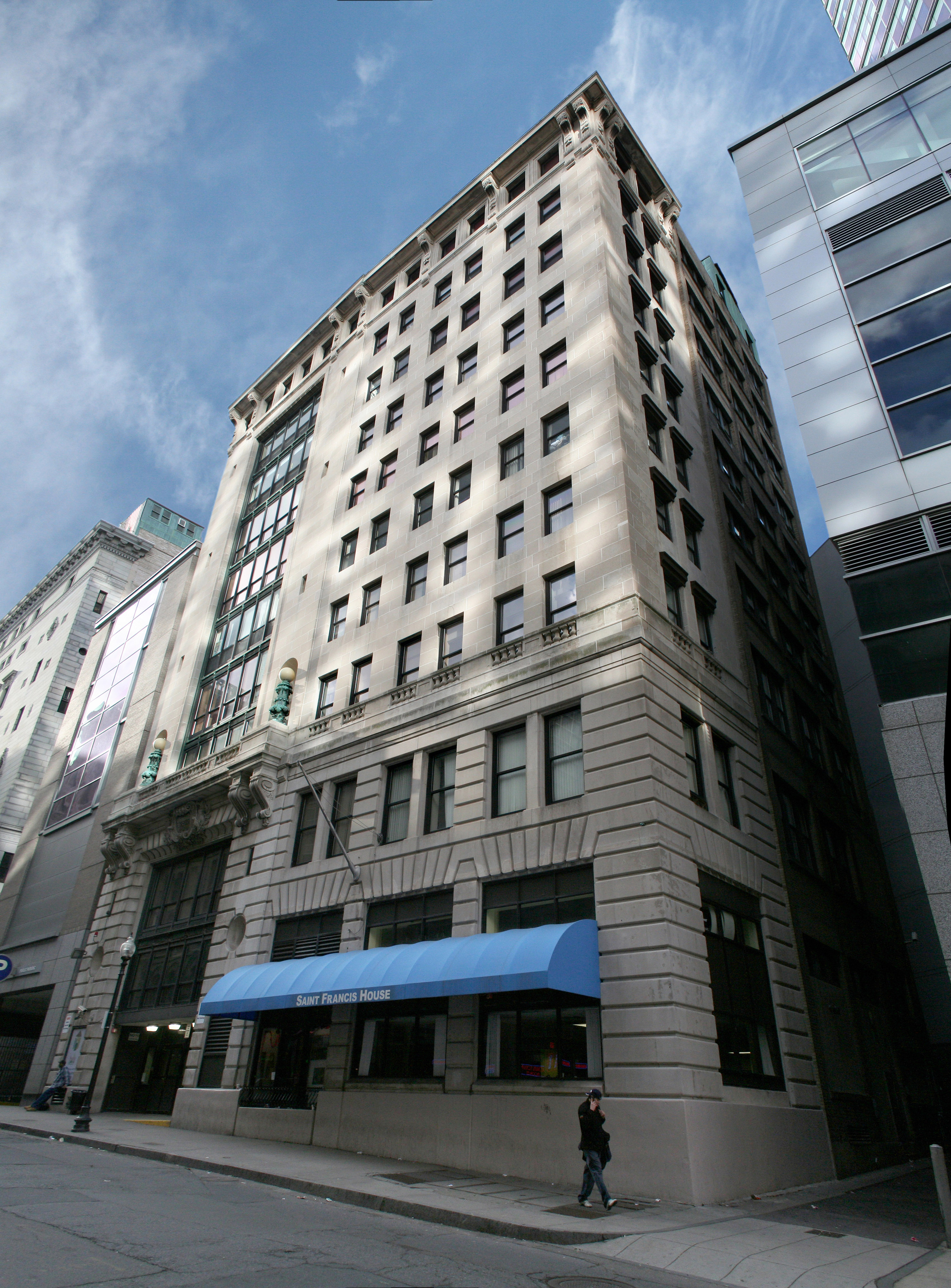
Boston Edison Electric Illuminating Company building, built in 1906

The Boston Edison Company (BECo) was incorporated as the Edison Electric Illuminating Company of Boston in 1886. It was one of the earliest electric utility companies in the United States of America. The company was formally renamed the Boston Edison Company in June 1937, although it had also been previously known by this name informally.

== Electric vehicles ==
Edward S. Mansfield was placed in charge of the company's activities in relation to electric vehicles. On 3 April 1911, EEICB organized a conference at the Hotel Thorndike, in Boston to encourage closer co-operation between electric vehicle manufacturers and central station managers in the Boston area. Dugald C. Jackson attended and promised the support of MIT in providing scientific research to support the development of the electric vehicle industry.

== Timeline ==
- 1886 - Incorporated as the Edison Electric Illuminating Company of Boston
- 1901 - Acquired Suburban Light and Power Company
- 1902 - Acquired Boston Electric Light Company (making Boston Edison a monopoly in the city)
- 1903 - Acquired Milton Light and Power Company, Framingham Electric Company, Somerville Electric Light Company, and three others
- 1904 - Boston Edison Power Station constructed
- 1916 - Boston Edison installs first master clock invented by Telechron founder Henry Ellis Warren to transmit 60 hertz of alternating current to synchronous electric clocks
- 1923 - Mobile radio station WTAT starts operation
- 1924 - Radio station WEEI starts operation now (WEZE)
- 1925 - Edgar Station starts operation in Weymouth
- 1937 - Officially renamed as Boston Edison Company
- 1943 - Mystic Generating Station starts operation
- 1967 - Member of Eastern Massachusetts and Vermont Energy Control in 1967
- 1969 - Member of Rhode Island-Eastern Massachusetts-Vermont Energy Control
- 1971 - Member of New England Power Pool
- 1972 - Pilgrim Nuclear Power Station starts operation (under construction since 1967)
- 1993 - Development of smart meters that communicate by radio

== Disappearance as independent company ==
In 1999 it was merged with Cambridge Electric Light Company, Commonwealth Electric Company, and NSTAR Gas Company to form NSTAR. After subsequent mergers, what remains of the Boston Edison Company is now part of Eversource Energy.

== South Boston power plant ==
The company operated the L Street Power Plant (now 776 Summer Street) in South Boston, which was constructed in 1898, with the turbine hall constructed in 1903. At the time of decommissioning it belonged to Exelon, which sold it for redevelopment in 2016. The Exelon New Boston Power Plant had been built on the same property without demolishing the original Edison building.

Real estate firms Redgate and Hilco Redevelopment proposed a mixed-use development, which would require the state to release a 2014 deed restriction prohibiting residential construction. The site adjoins Conley Terminal and its haul road (which is the reason for the restriction), and a reserved shipping channel.
