= William W. Kincaid =

American entrepreneur, businessman, executive, and inventor

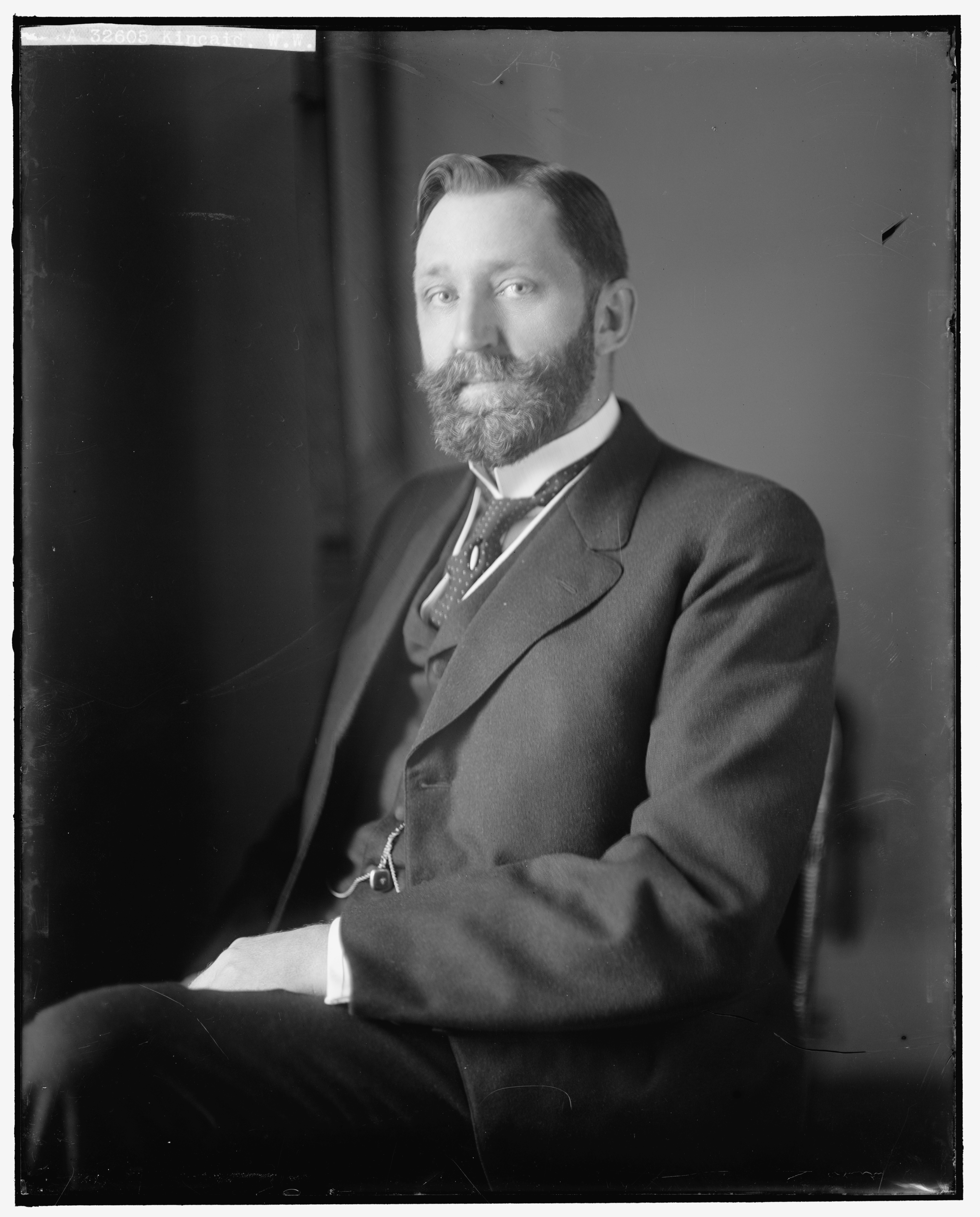

William Wallace Kincaid (April 26, 1868 – May 19, 1946) was an American entrepreneur, businessman, executive, and inventor. He was founder of the Spirella Co., manufacturer of Spirella corsets, and served as president of the National Personnel Association and as president of the American Management Association.

== Biography ==
=== Youth, education, and early career ===
Kincaid was born in 1868 in Wayne Township, Erie County, Pennsylvania, son of Reverend John S. Kincaid and Margaretta (Tuttle) Kincaid. He graduated from the High School in Corry, Pennsylvania in 1887. After his graduation in 1887 Kincaid started as a book canvasser, and in 1896 entered the publishing business. In 1904 he founded Spirella Co., Inc., a corset manufacturer in Niagara Falls, New York. In the same city he became counsellor of the national chamber and president of the Niagara Falls chamber.

=== Further career ===
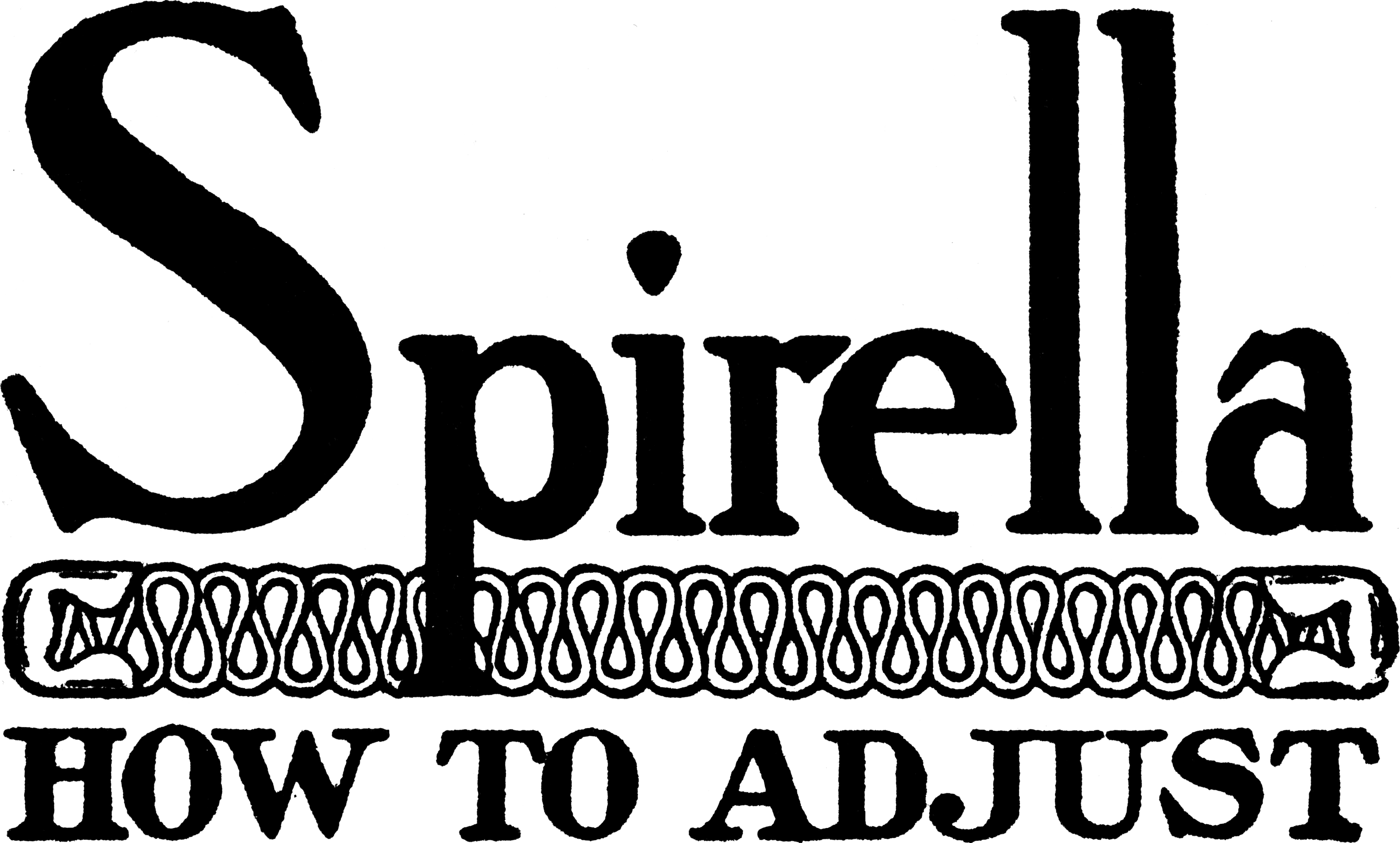
Spirella logo, 1913.

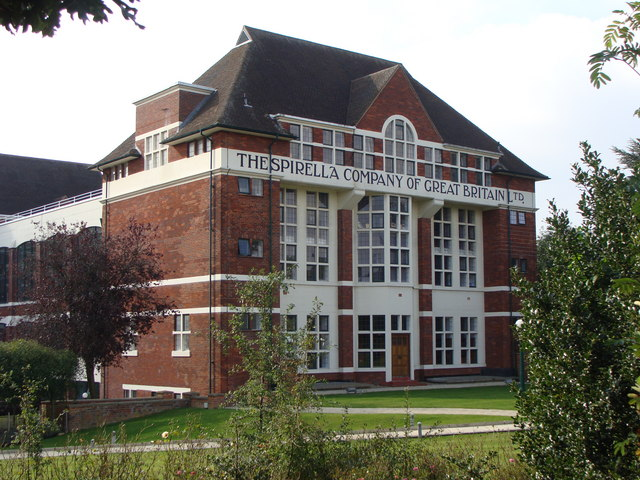
The Spirella Building in Letchworth

In 1908 Kincaid started expanding his company abroad. He founded The Spirella Co. of Canada Ltd. in Niagara Falls, Ontario in 1908, The Spirella Co. of Great Britain Ltd. in Letchworth in Hertfordshire, England in 1909, and the Korsettfabriken Spirella Aktiebolag in Sweden in 1920.

Before and after World War I, Kincaid represented the United States Chamber of Commerce on the international check committee in London, in 1914, 1920 and 1921, and served as delegate to the International Chamber of Commerce. Back in the States he served as president of the National Personnel Association in 1922, and as president of the American Management Association in 1928 as successor of Frank L. Sweetser.

=== Personal ===
Kincaid married Clara Elizabeth Greenley on May 28, 1894.

== Selected publications ==
Articles, a selection

- Kincaid, W. W. "Requirements of the Educational and Non-Theatrical Entertainment Field." Transactions of the Society of Motion Picture Engineers 8.18 (1924): 111–118.
- American Management Association, and William Wallace Kincaid. Co-ordination of Executive Activities, the Major Management Problem. 1923.
- Kincaid, William Wallace. "Canadian-American Friendship." New York History 18.1 (1937): 41–43.

Patents, a selection

- Kincaid, William W. "Rubber hose." U.S. Patent No. 1,206,230. November 28, 1916.
- Kincaid, Walter W. "Automatic gate." U.S. Patent No. 1,944,349. January 23, 1934.
