= Central station (electricity) =

A central station was the name given to the first generation of power stations in the late nineteenth and early twentieth century. Prior to the establishment of electricity grids, central stations were as yet unconnected with one another, each being the sole source of electrical supply to nearby consumers.

Central Stations played a key role in the development of electric vehicles: the Electric Vehicle Association of America (EVAA) had representatives from 10 central stations when it was founded in 1910. The New England section of the EVAA, founded in 1909 was called the “Electric Vehicle and Central Station Association”. The monthly official journal of the EVAA was called The Central Station published by Harry Cushing Jr. and edited by Newton Harris.

Cushing and Harris published Central Station Management in 1916.
