= Henry Noll =

Henry Noll (1871–1925) was a resident of Bethlehem, Pennsylvania, made famous in a (fictionalized and error-riddled) anecdote used by Frederick Winslow Taylor to illustrate his theories of scientific management.

== Schmidt in Principles of Scientific Management ==
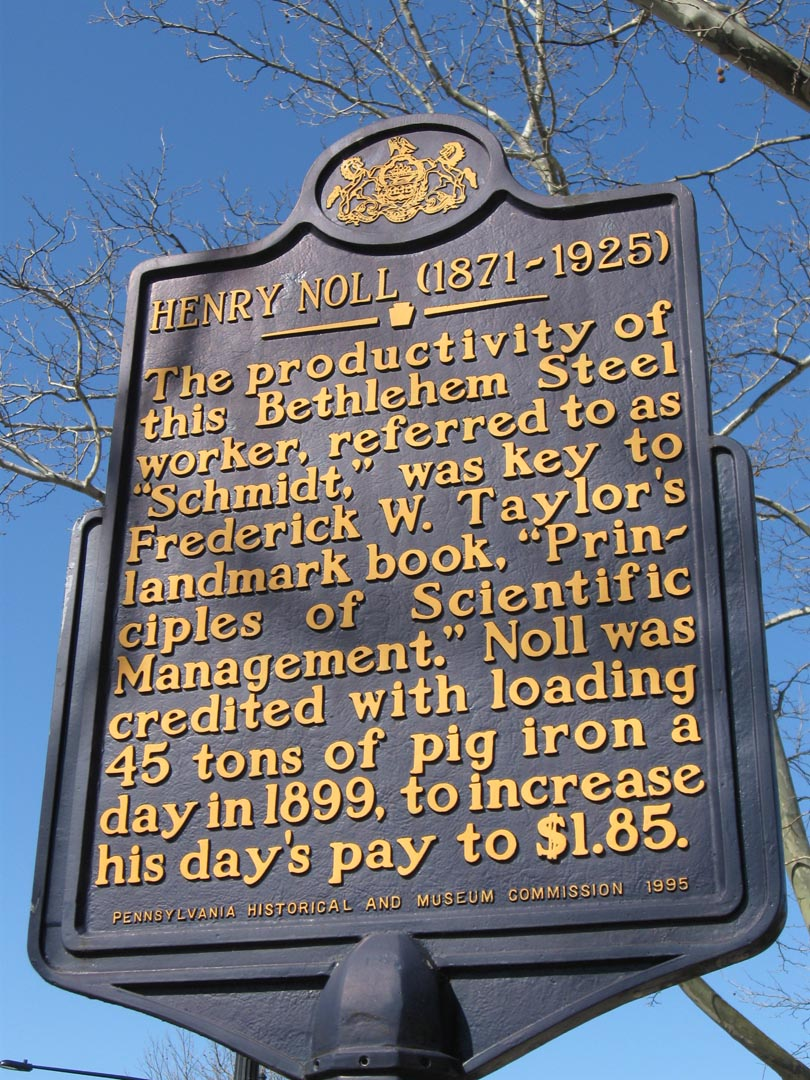
Noll's historical marker on S. 3rd St.

Noll came to public attention in the writing and speaking of 'scientific management' proponent Frederick Winslow Taylor. In Taylor's Principles of Scientific Management, he describes a study conducted at Bethlehem Steel in 1898 regarding the loading of pig iron onto railroad cars. At the start of the study, workers were loading an average of 12.5 tons of pig per laborer per day and received a wage of $1.15 per day, regardless of individual output. The Bethlehem Steel management wanted to increase workers' output and shift to a piece-rate wage of $.0375 per ton. Under the target piece-rate, workers would have to load more than 30 tons per day (or 250% of the current output) to earn the same wage. Two of Taylor's employees worked at the Bethlehem Steel plant, experimenting with loading strategies and searching out exemplary workers to serve as models for the assertion that "a good day's wages could be made at the existing rates by a good man".

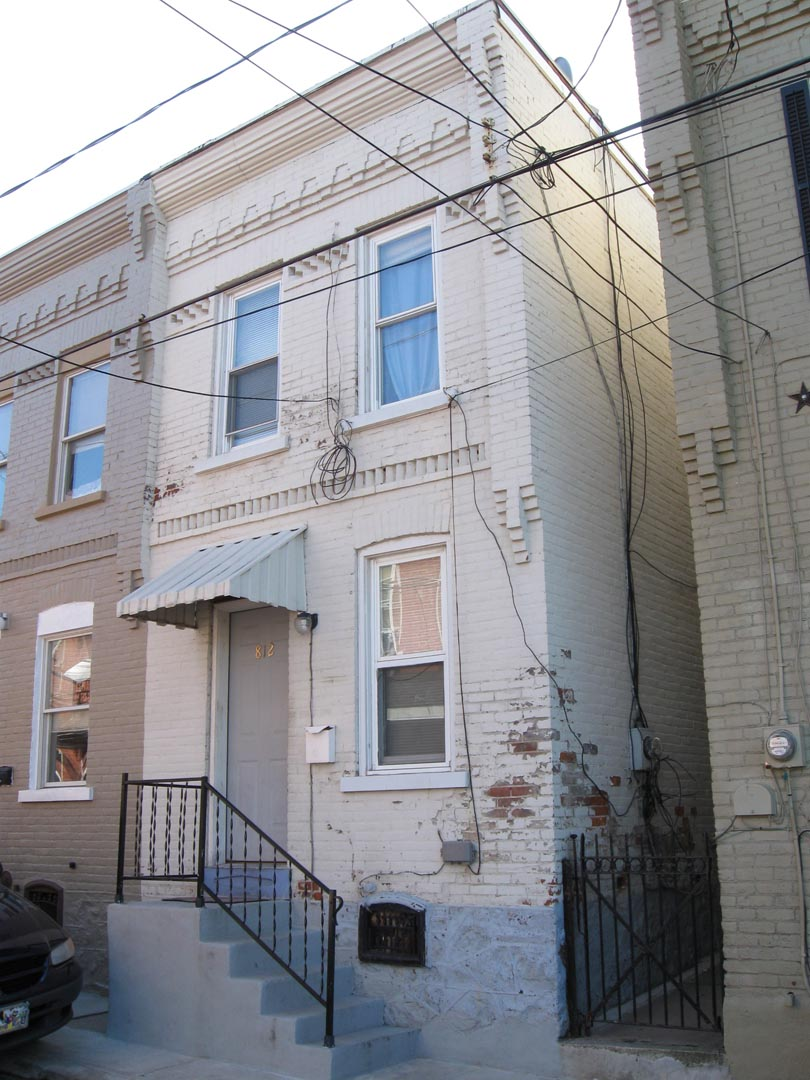
Noll's home, 812 Laufer St.

Henry Noll was one of the workers identified by Taylor's employees as being capable of loading the target rate of 49 tons per day, and therefore being able to earn the increased efficiency wage of $1.85. Other workers who had tried and failed to load the target rate, including workers who injured themselves and were no longer able to continue, were excluded from the analysis.

In Taylor's anecdote (versions of which were presented as early as 1901), he presents Noll as 'Schmidt,' "a little Pennsylvania Dutchman who had been observed to trot back home for a mile or so after his work in the evening, about as fresh as he was when he came trotting down to work in the morning". In Taylor's telling, which was "frankly insulting", 'Schmidt' is a dim-witted but outstanding laborer with a heavy German accent. He is extremely motivated to earn more money, as he has purchased a piece of property in Bethlehem and is building a house on the land.

== Research into Schmidt's true identity ==
Interest in establishing the identity of Schmidt began in 1933, when Hugh S. TenEyck (a professor at Lehigh University) conducted an unsuccessful search. In 1974, Charles D. Wrege and Amadeo Perroni were successful in establishing many details of Noll's biography.

== Noll's true identity ==
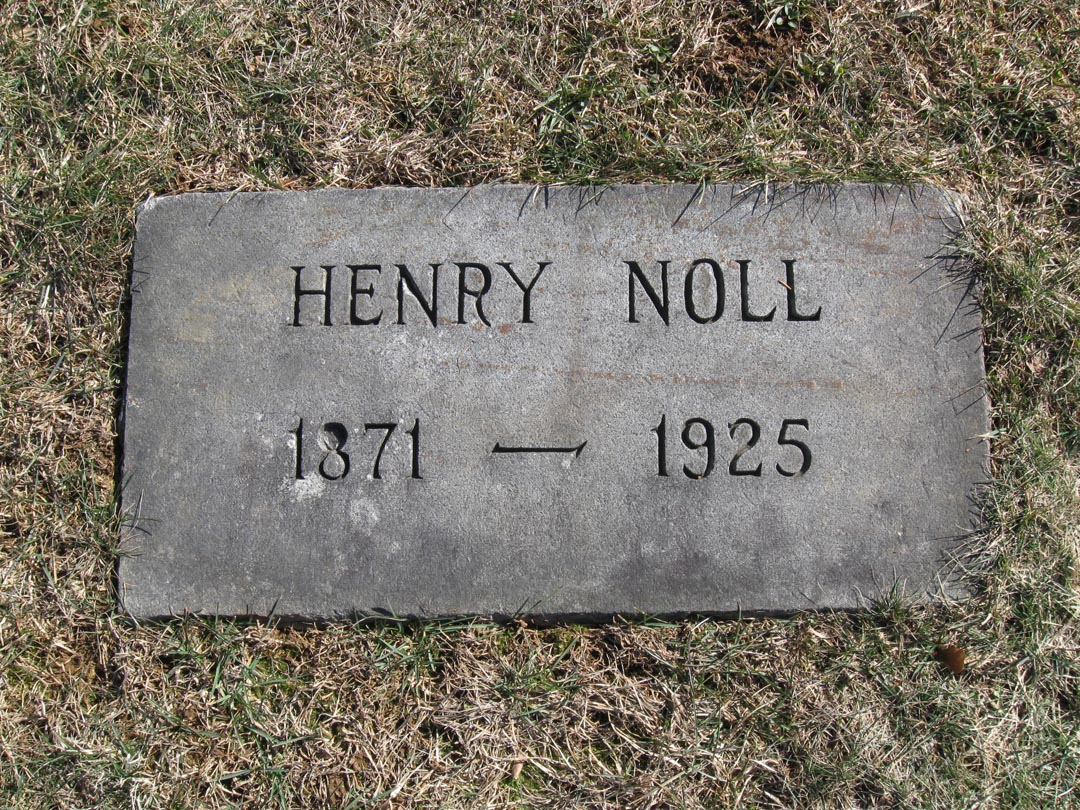
Noll's grave marker

In reality, 'Schmidt' was Henry Noll. (The original research reports misspell his surname as "Knolle".) The original research reports records his height as being 5'7", weight 135 pounds. He was not the shortest worker among those recorded by the researchers, but he did weigh the least. Originally a native of nearby Shimerville, Pennsylvania, at the time he lived at 812 Laufer Street, on the Southside of Bethlehem. He had purchased land, and later completed a house, at 313 Martin Lane on the Northside. He was a volunteer fireman at the Good Will Fire Department, close to his house on Martin Lane. He is buried at Bethlehem Memorial Park.

== Commemoration ==
Noll is currently commemorated by a historical marker on 3rd St. on the Southside of Bethlehem, across the street from the former Bethlehem Steel plant where he worked at the turn of the century.
