= Frederick Winslow Taylor =

American mechanical engineer (1856–1915)

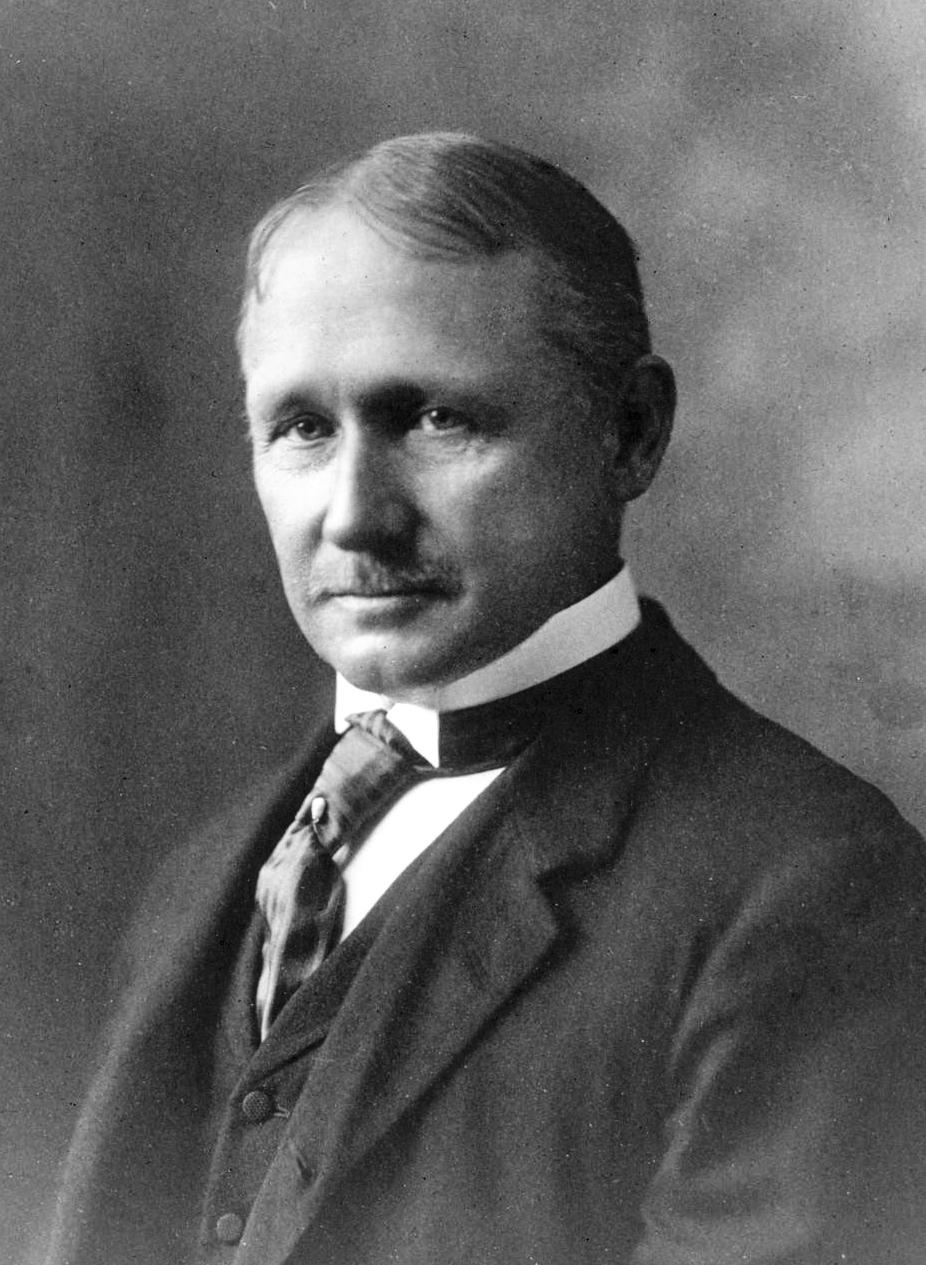
- Taylor c. 1907
- Born: March 20, 1856; Philadelphia, Pennsylvania, U.S.
- Died: March 21, 1915 (aged 59); Philadelphia, Pennsylvania, U.S.
- Resting place: West Laurel Hill Cemetery; Bala Cynwyd, Pennsylvania, U.S.
- Education: Stevens Institute of Technology (BS)
- Occupations: Efficiency expert Management consultant
- Known for: Father of scientific management, efficiency movement and industrial engineering
- Spouse: Louise M. Spooner
- Children: 3

Frederick Winslow Taylor (March 20, 1856 – March 21, 1915) was an American mechanical engineer. He was widely known for his methods to improve industrial efficiency. He was one of the first management consultants. In 1909, Taylor summed up his efficiency techniques in his book The Principles of Scientific Management which, in 2001, Fellows of the Academy of Management voted the most influential management book of the twentieth century. His pioneering work in applying engineering principles to the work done on the factory floor was instrumental in the creation and development of the branch of engineering that is now known as industrial engineering. Taylor made his name, and was most proud of his work, in scientific management; as a result, scientific management is sometimes referred to as Taylorism. His main source of income came from patenting improvements to steelmaking.

== Biography ==
Taylor was born in 1856 to a Quaker family in Germantown, Philadelphia, Pennsylvania. Taylor's father, Franklin Taylor, a Princeton-educated lawyer, built his wealth on mortgages. Taylor's mother, Emily Annette Taylor (née Winslow), was an ardent abolitionist and a coworker with Lucretia Mott. His father's ancestor, Samuel Taylor, settled in Burlington, New Jersey, in 1677. His mother's ancestor, Edward Winslow, was one of the fifteen original Mayflower Pilgrims who brought servants or children, and one of eight who had the honorable distinction of Mister. Winslow served for many years as the Governor of the Plymouth colony.

The Taylor family had inherited wealth and property, and the family's assets were maintained by Franklin's older brother, Caleb Newbold Taylor.

Educated early by his mother, Taylor studied for two years in France and Germany and traveled Europe for 18 months. In 1872, he entered Phillips Exeter Academy in Exeter, New Hampshire, with the plan of eventually going to Harvard University and becoming a lawyer like his father. In 1874, Taylor passed the Harvard entrance examinations with honors. However, due allegedly to rapidly deteriorating eyesight caused by night study, Taylor chose quite a different path.

Instead of attending Harvard University, Taylor became an apprentice patternmaker and machinist, gaining shop-floor experience at Enterprise Hydraulic Works in Philadelphia (a pump-manufacturing company whose proprietors were friends of the Taylor family). During this time, his eyesight recovered. He left his apprenticeship for six months and represented a group of New England machine-tool manufacturers at Philadelphia's centennial exposition. Taylor finished his four-year apprenticeship and in 1878 became a machine-shop laborer at Midvale Steel Works. At Midvale, he was quickly promoted to time clerk, journeyman machinist, machine shop foreman, research director, and finally chief engineer of the works (while maintaining his position as machine shop foreman). Taylor's fast promotions reflected both his talent and his family's relationship with Edward Clark, part owner of Midvale Steel. (Edward Clark's son Clarence Clark, who was also a manager at Midvale Steel, married Taylor's sister.)

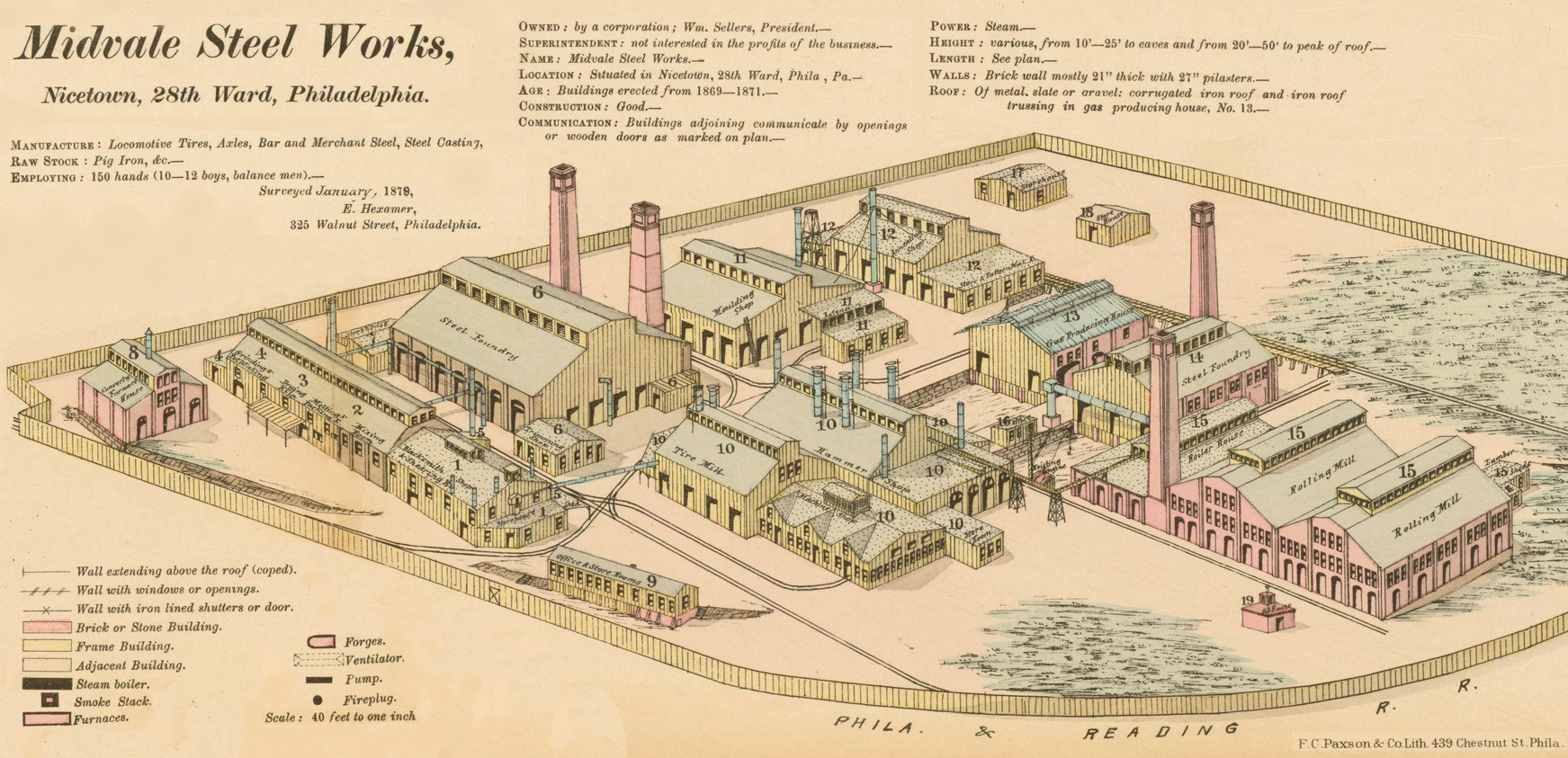
Midvale Steel Works aerial view, 1879

Early on at Midvale, working as a laborer and machinist, Taylor recognized that workmen were working their machines, or themselves, not nearly as hard as they could (a practice that at the time was called "soldiering") and that this resulted in high labor costs for the company. When he became a foreman he expected more output from the workmen. In order to determine how much work should properly be expected, he began to study and analyze the productivity of both the men and the machines (although the word "productivity" was not used at the time, and the applied science of productivity had not yet been developed). His focus on the human component of production Taylor labeled scientific management.

While Taylor worked at Midvale, he and Clarence Clark won the first tennis doubles tournament in the 1881 US National Championships, the precursor of the US Open. Taylor became a student of Stevens Institute of Technology, studying via correspondence and obtaining a bachelor's degree in mechanical engineering in 1883. On May 3, 1884, he married Louise M. Spooner of Philadelphia.

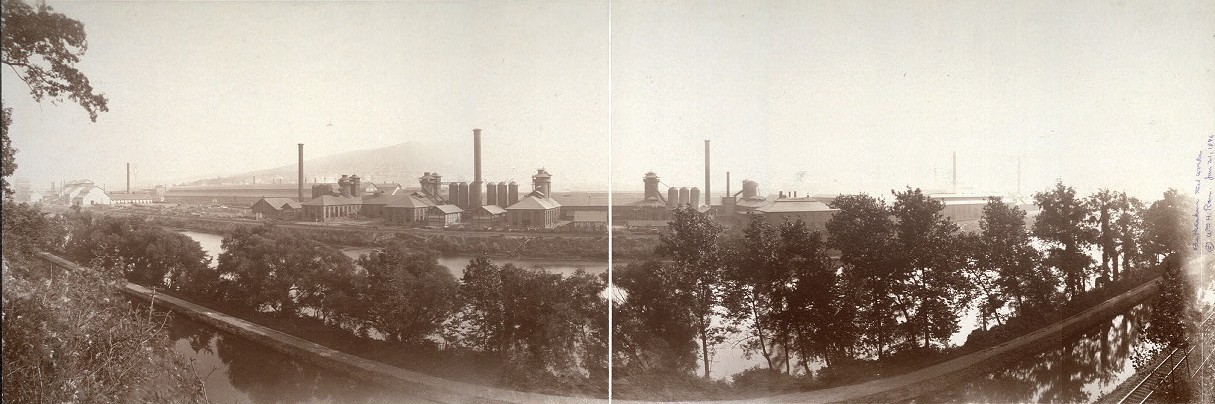
The Bethlehem Steel plant, 1896

From 1890 until 1893 Taylor worked as a general manager and a consulting engineer to management for the Manufacturing Investment Company of Philadelphia, a company that operated large paper mills in Maine and Wisconsin. He was a plant manager in Maine. In 1893, Taylor opened an independent consulting practice in Philadelphia. His business card read "Consulting Engineer - Systematizing Shop Management and Manufacturing Costs a Specialty". Through these consulting experiences, Taylor perfected his management system. His first paper, A Piece Rate System, was presented to the American Society of Mechanical Engineers (ASME) in June 1895.

In 1898 he joined Bethlehem Steel to solve an expensive machine-shop capacity problem. While at Bethlehem, he discovered the best known and most profitable of his many patents: between 1898 and 1900 Taylor and Maunsel White (né Maunsel White III; 1856–1912; grandson of Maunsel White; 1783–1863) conducted comprehensive empirical tests, and concluded that tungsten alloyed steel doubled or quadrupled cutting speeds. The inventors received US$100,000 (equivalent to about $3,900,000 in 2025) for the English patents alone, although the U.S. patent was eventually nullified.

Taylor was forced to leave Bethlehem Steel in 1901 after discord with other managers. Now a wealthy man, Taylor focused the remainder of his career promoting his management and machining methods through lecturing, writing, and consulting. From 1904 - 1914, Taylor lived in Philadelphia with his wife and three adopted children. In 1910, owing to the Eastern Rate Case, Frederick Winslow Taylor and his Scientific Management methodologies became famous worldwide. In 1911, Taylor introduced his The Principles of Scientific Management paper to the ASME, eight years after his Shop Management paper.

On October 19, 1906, Taylor was awarded an honorary degree of Doctor of Science by the University of Pennsylvania. In the same year, he was elected president of the American Society of Mechanical Engineers. Taylor was elected to the American Philosophical Society in 1912. That same year, he gave testimony to a special committee of the US House of Representatives regarding his own and other systems of management. Taylor eventually became a professor at the Tuck School of Business at Dartmouth College. He was elected to the American Academy of Arts and Sciences in 1915. In early spring of that year, Taylor caught pneumonia and died, one day after his fifty-ninth birthday, on March 21, 1915. He was buried in West Laurel Hill Cemetery, in Bala Cynwyd, Pennsylvania.

== Work ==
Darwin, Marx, and Freud make up the trinity often cited as the "makers of the modern world." Marx would be taken out and replaced by Taylor if there were any justice... For hundreds of years there had been no increase in the ability of workers to turn out goods or to move goods... When Taylor started propounding his principles, nine out of every 10 working people did manual work, making or moving things, whether in manufacturing, farming, mining, or transportation... By 2010 it will constitute no more than one-tenth... The Productivity Revolution has become a victim of its own success. From now on what matters is the productivity of nonmanual workers. [bolding added] -- Peter Drucker, The Rise of the Knowledge Society Wilson Quarterly (Spring 1993) p.63-65

Taylor's crime, in the eyes of the unions, was his assertion that there is no "skilled work." In manual operations there is only "work." All work can be analyzed the same way... The unions... were craft monopolies, and membership in them was largely restricted to sons or relatives of members. They required an apprenticeship of five to seven years but had no systematic training or work study. The unions allowed nothing to be written down. There were not even blueprints or any other drawings of the work to be done. Union members were sworn to secrecy and forbidden to discuss their work with nonmembers. [bolding added] -- Peter Drucker, The Rise of the Knowledge Society Wilson Quarterly (Spring 1993) p.61-62

Taylor was a mechanical engineer who sought to improve industrial efficiency. He is regarded as the father of scientific management, and was one of the first management consultants and director of a famous firm. In Peter Drucker's description,

Frederick W. Taylor was the first man in recorded history who deemed work deserving of systematic observation and study. On Taylor's 'scientific management' rests, above all, the tremendous surge of affluence in the last seventy-five years which has lifted the working masses in the developed countries well above any level recorded before, even for the well-to-do. Taylor, though the Isaac Newton (or perhaps the Archimedes) of the science of work, laid only first foundations, however. Not much has been added to them since—even though he has been dead all of sixty years.

Taylor's scientific management consisted of four principles:

1. Replace rule-of-thumb work methods with methods based on a scientific study of the tasks.
2. Scientifically select, train, and develop each employee rather than passively leaving them to train themselves.
3. Provide "Detailed instruction and supervision of each worker in the performance of that worker's discrete task"
4. Divide work nearly equally between managers and workers, so that the managers apply scientific management principles to planning the work and the workers actually perform the tasks.

Future US Supreme Court justice Louis Brandeis coined the term scientific management in the course of his argument for the Eastern Rate Case (Brandeis vs Eastern Railroad) before the Interstate Commerce Commission in 1910. Brandeis argued that railroads, when governed according to Taylor's principles, did not need to raise rates to increase wages. Taylor used Brandeis's term in the title of his monograph The Principles of Scientific Management, published in 1911. The Eastern Rate Case propelled Taylor's ideas to the forefront of the management agenda. Taylor wrote to Brandeis, "I have rarely seen a new movement started with such great momentum as you have given this one." Taylor's approach is also often referred to as Taylor's Principles, or, frequently disparagingly, as Taylorism.

=== Managers and workers ===
The idea, then, of.. training [a workman] under a competent teacher into new working habits until he continually and habitually works in accordance with scientific laws, which have been developed by some one else, is directly antagonistic to the old idea that each workman can best regulate his own way of doing the work... the philosophy of the old management puts the entire responsibility upon the workmen, while the philosophy of the new places a great part of it upon the management. [bolding added] -- FW Taylor, The Principles of Scientific Management (1911) p.63

Taylor had very precise ideas about how to introduce his system:

It is only through enforced standardization of methods, enforced adoption of the best implements and working conditions, and enforced cooperation that this faster work can be assured. And the duty of enforcing the adoption of standards and enforcing this cooperation rests with the management alone.

Workers were to be selected appropriately for each task.

One of the very first requirements for a man who is fit to handle pig iron as a regular occupation is that he shall be so stupid and so phlegmatic that he more nearly resembles in his mental make-up the ox than any other type. The man who is mentally alert and intelligent is for this very reason entirely unsuited to what would, for him, be the grinding monotony of work of this character.

Taylor believed in transferring control from workers to management. He set out to increase the distinction between mental (planning work) and manual labor (executing work). Detailed plans, specifying the job and how it was to be done, were to be formulated by management and communicated to the workers.

The introduction of his system was often resented by workers and provoked numerous strikes. The strike at Watertown Arsenal led to the congressional investigation in 1912. Taylor believed the laborer was worthy of his hire, and pay was linked to productivity. His workers were able to earn substantially more than those under conventional management, and this earned him enemies among the owners of factories where scientific management was not in use.

=== Rhetorical techniques ===
Taylor promised to reconcile labor and capital.

With the triumph of scientific management, unions would have nothing left to do, and they would have been cleansed of their most evil feature: the restriction of output. To underscore this idea, Taylor fashioned the myth that 'there has never been a strike of men working under scientific management', trying to give it credibility by constant repetition. In similar fashion he incessantly linked his proposals to shorter hours of work, without bothering to produce evidence of "Taylorized" firms that reduced working hours, and he revised his famous tale of Schmidt carrying pig iron at Bethlehem Steel at least three times, obscuring some aspects of his study and stressing others, so that each successive version made Schmidt's exertions more impressive, more voluntary and more rewarding to him than the last. Unlike [Harrington] Emerson, Taylor was not a charlatan, but his ideological message required the suppression of all evidence of worker's dissent, of coercion, or of any human motives or aspirations other than those his vision of progress could encompass. For the stories about Schmidt Montgomery refers to Charles D. Wrege and Amadeo G. Perroni, "Taylor's Pig Tale: A Historical Analysis of Frederick W. Taylor's Pig-Iron experiments" in: Academy of Management Journal, 17 (March 1974), 6-27

Debate about Taylor's Bethlehem study of workers, particularly the stereotypical laborer "Schmidt", continues to this day. One 2009 study supports assertions Taylor made about the quite substantial increase in productivity, for even the most basic task of picking up, carrying and dropping pigs of iron.

=== Management theory ===
Taylor thought that by analyzing work, the "one best way" to do it would be found. He is most remembered for developing the stopwatch time study, which, combined with Frank Gilbreth's motion study methods, later became the field of time and motion study. He broke a job into its component parts and measured each to the hundredth of a minute. One of his most famous studies involved shovels. He noticed that workers used the same shovel for all materials. He determined that the most effective load was 21½ pounds, and found or designed shovels that for each material would scoop up that amount. He was generally unsuccessful in getting his concepts applied, and was dismissed from Bethlehem Iron Company/Bethlehem Steel Company. Nevertheless, Taylor was able to convince workers who used shovels and whose compensation was tied to how much they produced to adopt his advice about the optimum way to shovel by breaking the movements down into their component elements and recommending better ways to perform these movements. It was largely through his disciples' efforts (most notably Henry Gantt's) that industry came to implement his ideas. Moreover, the book he wrote after parting company with the Bethlehem company, Shop Management, sold well.

=== Relations with ASME ===
Taylor's written works were designed for presentation to the American Society of Mechanical Engineers (ASME). These include Notes on Belting (1894), A Piece-Rate System (1895), Shop Management (1903), Art of Cutting Metals (1906), and The Principles of Scientific Management (1911).

Taylor was president of the ASME from 1906 to 1907. While president, he tried to implement his system into the management of the ASME but met with much resistance. He was able to reorganize only the publications department and that only partially. He also forced out the ASME's longtime secretary, Morris Llewellyn Cooke, and replaced him with Calvin W. Rice. His tenure as president was trouble-ridden and marked the beginning of a period of internal dissension within the ASME during the Progressive Age.

In 1911, Taylor collected a number of his articles into a book-length manuscript, which he submitted to the ASME for publication. The ASME formed an ad hoc committee to review the text. The committee included Taylor allies such as James Mapes Dodge and Henry R. Towne. The committee delegated the report to the editor of the American Machinist, Leon P. Alford. Alford was a critic of the Taylor system and his report was negative. The committee modified the report slightly, but accepted Alford's recommendation not to publish Taylor's book. Taylor angrily withdrew the book and published Principles himself in 1912, without ASME approval.

== Taylor's influence ==
=== United States ===
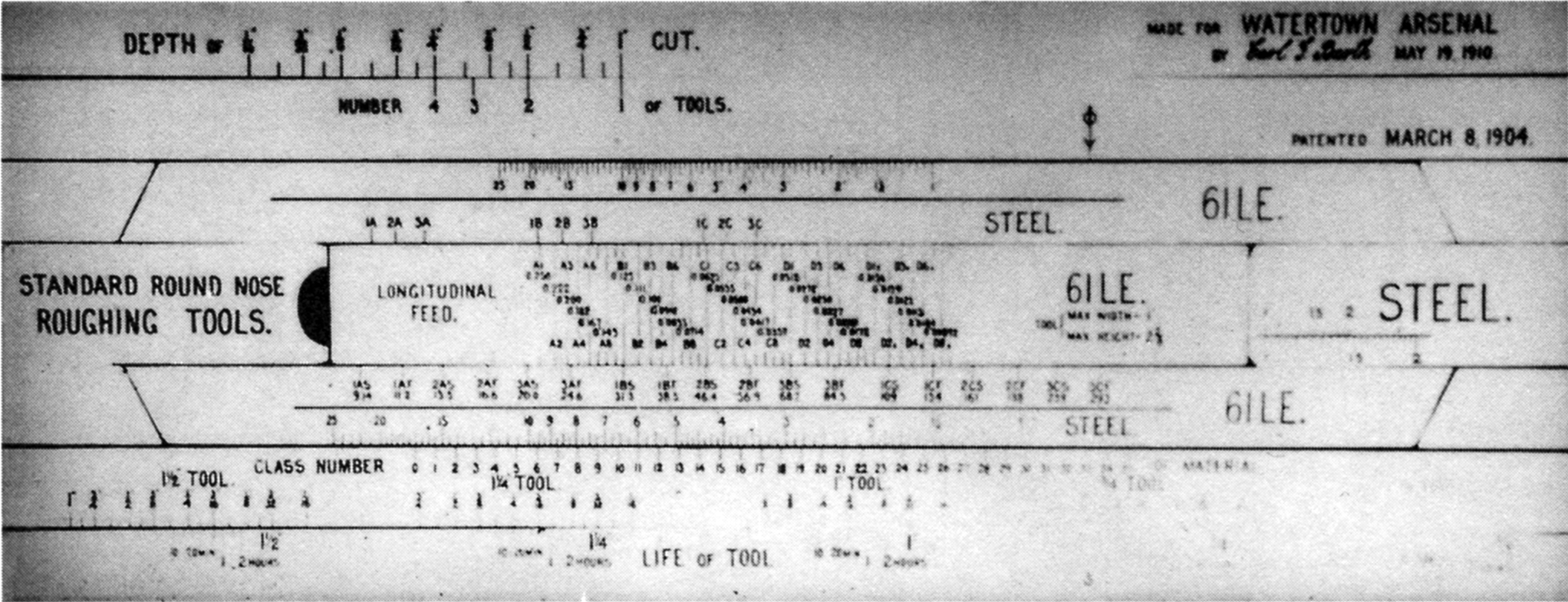
One of Carl G. Barth's speed-and-feed slide rules

A Gantt chart

- Carl G. Barth helped Taylor to develop speed-and-feed-calculating slide rules to a previously unknown level of usefulness. Similar aids are still used in machine shops today. Barth became an early consultant on scientific management and later taught at Harvard.
- H. L. Gantt developed the Gantt chart, a visual aid for scheduling tasks and displaying the flow of work.
- Harrington Emerson introduced scientific management to the railroad industry, and proposed the dichotomy of staff versus line employees, with the former advising the latter.
- Morris Cooke adapted scientific management to educational and municipal organizations.
- Hugo Münsterberg created industrial psychology.
- Lillian Gilbreth introduced psychology to management studies.
- Frank Gilbreth (husband of Lillian) discovered scientific management while working in the construction industry, eventually developing motion studies independently of Taylor. These logically complemented Taylor's time studies, as time and motion are two sides of the efficiency improvement coin. The two fields eventually became time and motion study.
- Harvard University, one of the first American universities to offer a graduate degree in business management in 1908, based its first-year curriculum on Taylor's scientific management.
- Harlow S. Person, as dean of Dartmouth's Amos Tuck School of Administration and Finance, promoted the teaching of scientific management.
- James O. McKinsey, professor of accounting at the University of Chicago and founder of the consulting firm bearing his name, advocated budgets as a means of assuring accountability and of measuring performance.

=== France ===
In France, Le Chatelier translated Taylor's work and introduced scientific management throughout government owned plants during World War I. This influenced the French theorist Henri Fayol, whose 1916 Administration Industrielle et Générale emphasized organizational structure in management. In the classic General and Industrial Management, Fayol wrote that "Taylor's approach differs from the one we have outlined in that he examines the firm from the 'bottom up.' He starts with the most elemental units of activity – the workers' actions – then studies the effects of their actions on productivity, devises new methods for making them more efficient, and applies what he learns at lower levels to the hierarchy ... " He suggests that Taylor has staff analysts and advisors working with individuals at lower levels of the organization to identify the ways to improve efficiency. According to Fayol, the approach results in a "negation of the principle of unity of command." Fayol criticized Taylor's functional management in this way: In Shop Management, Taylor said « ... the most marked outward characteristics of functional management lies in the fact that each workman, instead of coming in direct contact with the management at one point only, ... receives his daily orders and help from eight different bosses... these eight were (1) route clerks, (2) instruction card men, (3) cost and time clerks, (4) gang bosses, (5) speed bosses, (6) inspectors, (7) repair bosses, and the (8) shop disciplinarian. » Fayol said that this was an unworkable situation and that Taylor must have reconciled the differences in some way not described in Taylor's works.

Around 1922 the journalist Paulette Bernège became interested in Taylor's theories, which were popular in France in the post-war period. Bernège became the faithful disciple of the Domestic Sciences Movement that Christine Frederick had launched earlier in the United States, which Bernège adapted to French homes. Frederick had transferred the concepts of Taylorism from the factory to domestic work. These included suitable tools, rational study of movements and timing of tasks. Scientific standards for housework were derived from scientific standards for workshops, intended to streamline the work of a housewife. The Comité national de l'organisation française (CNOF) was founded in 1925 by a group of journalists and consulting engineers who saw Taylorism as a way to expand their client base. Founders included prominent engineers such as Henry Louis Le Châtelier and Léon Guillet. Bernège's Institute of Housekeeping Organization participated in various congresses on the scientific organization of work that led up to the founding of the CNOF, and in 1929 led to a section in CNOF on domestic economy.

=== Great Britain ===
Older historical accounts used to suggest that British industry had less interest in Taylor's teachings than in similarly sized countries. More recent research has revealed that British engineers and managers were as interested as in other countries. This disparity was largely due to a trend that historians have been analyzing: recent research has revealed that Taylor's practices diffused to Britain more through consultancies, in particular the Bedaux consultancy, than through institutions, as in Germany and to a lesser extent France, where a mixture was most effective.

Particularly enthusiastic were the Cadbury family, Seebohm Rowntree, Oliver Sheldon and Lyndall Urwick. In addition to establishing a consultancy to implement Taylor's system, Urwick, Orr & Partners, Urwick was also a key historian of F.W. Taylor and scientific management, publishing The Making of Scientific Management trilogy in the 1940s and The Golden Book of Management in 1956.

=== Switzerland ===
In Switzerland, the American Edward Albert Filene established the International Management Institute to spread information about management techniques. Lyndall Urwick was its director until the IMI closed in 1933.

=== USSR ===
In the Soviet Union, Vladimir Lenin was very impressed by Taylorism, which he and other Bolshevik leaders tried to incorporate into Soviet manufacturing. When Joseph Stalin took power in the 1920s, he championed the theory of "Socialism in one country" which denied that the Soviet economy needed foreign help to develop, and open advocates of Western management techniques fell into disfavor. No longer celebrated by Soviet leadership, Taylorism and the mass production methods of Henry Ford remained silent influences during the industrialization of the Soviet Union. Nevertheless, "[...] Frederick Taylor's methods have never really taken root in the Soviet Union." The voluntaristic approach of Stalin's Stakhanovite movement in the 1930s, fixated on setting individual records, was intrinsically opposed to Taylor's systematic approach and proved to be counter-productive. The stop-and-go of the production process – workers having nothing to do at the beginning of a month and 'storming' during illegal extra shifts at the end of the month – which prevailed even in the 1980s had nothing to do with the successfully taylorized plants e.g., of Toyota which are characterized by continuous production processes (heijunka) which are continuously improved (kaizen).

"The easy availability of replacement labor, which allowed Taylor to choose only 'first-class men,' was an important condition for his system's success." The situation in the Soviet Union was very different. "Because work is so unrhythmic, the rational manager will hire more workers than he would need if supplies were even in order to have enough for storming. Because of the continuing labor shortage, managers are happy to pay needed workers more than the norm, either by issuing false job orders, assigning them to higher skill grades than they deserve on merit criteria, giving them 'loose' piece rates, or making what is supposed to be 'incentive' pay, premia for good work, effectively part of the normal wage. As Mary McAuley has suggested under these circumstances piece rates are not an incentive wage, but a way of justifying giving workers whatever they 'should' be getting, no matter what their pay is supposed to be according to the official norms."

Taylor and his theories are also referenced (and put to practice) in the 1921 dystopian novel We by Yevgeny Zamyatin.

=== Canada ===
In the early 1920s, the Canadian textile industry was re-organized according to scientific management principles. In 1928, workers at Canada Cotton Ltd. in Hamilton, Ontario went on strike against newly introduced Taylorist work methods. Also, Henry Gantt, who was a close associate of Taylor, re-organized the Canadian Pacific Railway.

With the prevalence of US branch plants in Canada and close economic and cultural ties between the two countries, the sharing of business practices, including Taylorism, has been common.

=== The Taylor Society and its legacy ===
The Taylor Society was founded in 1912 by Taylor's allies to promote his values and influence. A decade after Taylor's death in 1915 the Taylor Society had 800 members, including many leading U.S. industrialists and managers. In 1936 the Society merged with the Society of Industrial Engineers, forming the Society for Advancement of Management, which still exists today.

=== Criticism of Taylor ===
Many of the critiques of Taylor come from Marxists. The earliest was by Antonio Gramsci, an Italian Communist, in his Prison Notebooks (1937). Gramsci argued that Taylorism subordinates the workers to management. He also argued that the repetitive work produced by Taylorism might actually give rise to revolutionary thoughts in workers' minds.

Harry Braverman's work Labor and Monopoly Capital: The Degradation of Work in the Twentieth Century, published in 1974, was critical of scientific management and of Taylor in particular. This work pioneered the field of Labor Process Theory as well as contributing to the historiography of the workplace.

Management theorist Henry Mintzberg is highly critical of Taylor's methods. Mintzberg states that an obsession with efficiency allows measurable benefits to overshadow less quantifiable social benefits completely, and social values get left behind.

Taylor's methods have also been challenged by socialists. Their arguments relate to progressive defanging of workers in the workplace and the subsequent degradation of work as management, powered by capital, uses Taylor's methods to render work repeatable and precise yet monotonous and skill-reducing. James W. Rinehart argued that Taylor's methods of transferring control over production from workers to management, and the division of labor into simple tasks, intensified the alienation of workers that had begun with the factory system of production around the period 1870 to 1890.

Criticism of Taylor and the Japanese model, according to Kōnosuke Matsushita:

We are going to win and the industrial west is going to lose out. There’s nothing you can do about it, because the reasons for failure are within yourselves. Your firms are built on the Taylor model. Even worse, so are your heads. With your bosses doing the thinking while workers wield the screwdrivers, you're convinced deep down that it is the right way to run a business. For the essence of management is getting ideas out of the heads of the bosses and into the heads of labor. We are beyond your mindset. Business, we know, is now so complex and difficult, the survival of firms so hazardous in an environment increasingly unpredictable, competitive and fraught with danger, that their continued existence depends on the day-to-day mobilization of every ounce of intelligence.

Frederick Taylor has been criticized by his approach to management, which focused on maximizing efficiency and productivity by breaking down tasks to simplest components often resulted in the dehumanization of workers. By breaking down tasks into the smallest possible units and timing workers to ensure they met strict quotas, Taylor's methods treated workers more like a machine and neglecting the social and psychological needs of workers such as the sense of belonging and creativity which can impact workers morale and willingness to work hard.

== Tennis and golf accomplishments ==
Taylor was an accomplished tennis and golf player. He and Clarence Clark won the inaugural United States National tennis doubles championship at Newport Casino in 1881, defeating Alexander Van Rensselaer and Arthur Newbold (né Arthur Emlen Newbold; 1859–1920) in straight sets. In the 1900 Summer Olympics, Taylor finished fourth in golf.

Result	Year	Championship	Surface	Partner	Opponents	Score
Win	1881	U.S. Doubles Championships	Grass	(United States) Frederick W. Taylor (United States) Clarence Clark	(United States) Alexander Van Rensselaer (United States) Arthur Newbold	6–5, 6–4, 6–5

== Publications ==
Books

- 1903, 1911. Taylor, Frederick Winslow (1911). Shop Management (With an introduction by Henry R. Towne). New York, London: Harper & Brothers.
- 1911. Taylor, Frederick Winslow (1919) [1911]. The Principles of Scientific Management. Harper & Brothers – via Internet Archive (Prelinger Library). LCCN 11-10339; OCLC 233134 (all editions).
  The Principles of Scientific Management – via Project Gutenberg.
- 1911. Taylor, Frederick Winslow; Thompson, Sanford Eleazer (1907). A Treatise on Concrete, Plain and Reinforced: Materials, Construction, and Design of Concrete and Reinforced Concrete (1st ed.). New York: John Wiley & Sons – via Internet Archive (University of Toronto). OCLC 1722781 (all editions).
- 1912. Taylor, Frederick Winslow; Thompson, Sanford Eleazer (1912). Concrete Costs (1st ed.; 1st issue). John Wiley & Sons – via Internet Archive (University of Wisconsin–Madison). LCCN 12-10295; OCLC 2272138 (all editions).

Selected articles

- 1894. "Notes on Belting". Transactions. 15. American Society of Mechanical Engineers: 204–259. 1880 – via Internet Archive (University of Toronto). OCLC 1052127574 (all editions).
- 1896. "A Piece-Rate System". Economic Studies. 1 (2). American Economic Association: 89–129. June 1896 – via Internet Archive (University of Michigan). OCLC 1076000 (all editions).
- 1903. "Shop Management". Transactions (No. 1003). 24. American Society of Mechanical Engineers: 1337–1480. 1880 – via Internet Archive (University of Toronto). OCLC 6077365 (all editions).
- 1906. "On the Art of Cutting Metals". Transactions (No. 1119). 28. American Society of Mechanical Engineers: 31–350. 1880 – via Internet Archive (University of Toronto). OCLC 9057615 (all editions).

== Bibliography ==
=== References ===
Secondary sources – books, journals, magazines, and papers
- Atta, Don Van (April 1986). "Why Is There No Taylorism in the Soviet Union?". Comparative Politics. 18 (33): 327–337. doi:10.2307/421614. JSTOR 421614. doi:10.2307/421614; JSTOR 421614; ISSN 0010-4159; OCLC 5548842780, 8313710703, 13565305.
- Baruch, Yehuda (March 1, 2009). "Once Upon a Time There Was an Organization: Organizational Stories as Antitheses to Fairy Tales". Journal of Management Inquiry. 18 (1): 15–25. doi:10.1177/1056492606294522. S2CID 144074635. ISSN 1056-4926, ISSN 1552-6542; doi:10.1177/1056492606294522; OCLC 439088502, 5234861190; ProQuest 1928625238, 203317764 (ABI/Inform Collection).
- Bedeian, Arthur G.; Wren, Daniel Alan (Winter 2001). "Most Influential Management Books of the 20th Century" (PDF). Organizational Dynamics. 29 (3): 221–225. doi:10.1016/S0090-2616(01)00022-5 – via Louisiana State University. ISSN 0090-2616; doi:10.1016/S0090-2616(01)00022-5; OCLC 5198509376.
- Bernège, Paulette (1989). "Le Tuyau: ÉLément Essentiel de Civilisation" [The Pipe: Essential Element of Civilization]. Flux, Numéro Spécial (presented by Georges Ribeill). 5: 59 – via Persée. doi:10.3406/flux.1989.910; ISSN 1154-2721; OCLC 8333955036, 4648688853, 732458564.
- Braverman, Harry (1974). Labor and Monopoly Capital: The Degradation of Work in the Twentieth Century (see Labor and Monopoly Capital). pp. 43–52 – via Internet Archive. LCCN 74-7785; ISBN 0-8534-5340-3; OCLC 13085658 (all editions).
- Brown, Percy Shiras (May 1925). "The Works and Aims of the Taylor Society". Annals of the American Academy of Political and Social Science. 119: 134–139. doi:10.1177/000271622511900121. JSTOR 1015419. S2CID 143498508. doi:10.1177/000271622511900121; JSTOR 1015419; ISSN 0002-7162; OCLC 5546400949, 5723415222.
- Copley, Frank Barkley (1923). Frederick W. Taylor, Father of Scientific Management. Harper & Brothers. (2 Vols.) LCCN 23-17530; OCLC 807494 (all editions).
1. Vol. 1. Taylor Society. 1923 – via HathiTrust (University of Michigan Library).
2. Vol. 2. Harper and Brothers. 1923 – via HathiTrust (University of California Libraries).
  pp. 396–397. Taylor Society. 1923. → "The first statement of his management methods in general he reserved for his paper A Piece-Rate System read by him at the Detroit meeting of the A.S.M.E. in June, 1895."
- D'Aveni, Richard Anthony (Winter 2003). "On Changing the Conversation: Tuck and the Field of Strategy". Tuck Today (alumni magazine of the Tuck School of Business at Dartmouth). Hanover, New Hampshire. Archived from the original on August 4, 2007. OCLC 18735559 (all editions).
- Drucker, Peter F. (Spring 1993). "The Rise of the Knowledge Society" (PDF). The Wilson Quarterly. 17 (2): 52–71. OCLC 5234803341, 4595414907, 8658889301 & 30828911.
- Drucker, Peter F. (1974). Management: Tasks, Responsibilities, Practices. New York: Harper & Row – via Internet Archive. ISBN 978-1-4128-0627-5.
- Dumont, Marie-Jeanne (September 2012). "Si Les Femmes Faisaient Les Maisons, la Croisade de Paulette Bernège" [If Women Made Houses – The Crusade of Paulette Bernège]. Criticat (re: Paulette Bernège's 1928 book, If Women Made Houses) (in French). 10: 36–40.
  Transcribed on Éditions D-Fiction (blog). Archived from the original on May 6, 2016 – via Wayback Machine.
- Drury, Horace Bookwalter (1918). "Scientific Management; A History and Criticism". Studies in History, Economics and Public Law (this is a re-print of Drury's 1915 PhD dissertation at Columbia). 65 (1, whole no. 157). Edited by the Faculty of Political Science of Columbia University: 100 – via Internet Archive (Cornell University Library).
  "Mr. Taylor has taken out about one hundred patents, his greatest invention being the discovery between 1898 and 1900, jointly with Mr. Maunsel White, of the Taylor-White process of treating tungsten steel. This invention, according to the highest authorities, has revolutionized the machine shops of the world, enabling tools to cut metal at least three times as rapidly as before. The inventors received $100,000 [equivalent to $3,583,000 in 2025] for the English patents alone. Fame again came to Mr. Taylor upon his publication, in 1906, of the results of the extended researches of himself and others in the art of cutting metals – a work of genuine scientific character, and of the highest practical importance. Mr. Taylor, however, regarded as of far greater moment than all this other work his share in the discovery of the principles of scientific management."
- Epstein, Marc J. (1996). "Taylor, Frederick Winslow (1856–1915)". In Chatfield, Michael; Vangermeersch, Richard (eds.). History of Accounting: An International Encyclopedia. New York: Garland Publishing. pp. 579–580. ISBN 9780815308096 – via Internet Archive.
- Fayol, Henri (1949). General and Industrial Management – via Internet Archive.
- Fayol, Henri (1988). Revised by Irwin Gray (ed.). General and Industrial Management: Henri Fayol's Classic. Belmont, California: Pitman Publishing. ISBN 9780273029816 – via Internet Archive.
- Frederick Winslow Taylor – A Memorial Volume, Being Addresses Delivered at the Funeral of Frederick Winslow Taylor, Cedron, Indian Queen Lane, Germantown, Philadelphia, Pa., March 24, 1915; At a Memorial Meeting Held Under the Auspices of the Society to Promote the Science of Management (Now Taylor Society) University of Pennsylvania, Philadelphia, Pa., October 22, 1915; And at Mr. Taylor's Home "Boxly," Chestnut Hill, Philadelphia, Pa., October 23, 1915. Taylor Society. 1920 – via Internet Archive (Library of Congress). LCCN 21-1438.
- Frederick Taylor University. "About" → "Frederick Winslow Taylor, M.E., Sc.D.".
  The "M.E." represents Taylor's 1883 Bachelor's degree in Mechanical Engineering from Stevens Institute of Technology; the "Sc.D." was an honorary degree conferred by Penn in 1906.
- "F.W. Taylor Collection: Patents". Samuel C. Williams Library, Stevens Institute of Technology. 2001. Archived from the original on November 12, 2007. (Series III of the Collection – "Patents and Correspondence Relating to Patents") OCLC 123905137.
- Harrison, Charles Custis (October 8, 1906). "Letter to Taylor" (item no. 053G001) – via Stevens Institute of Technology Archives. Frederick Winslow Taylor Collection. OCLC 123905137.
- Head, Simon (2003). The New Ruthless Economy – Work and Power in the Digital Age. Oxford University Press. ISBN 978-0-19-516601-9 – via Internet Archive (Lexington Public Library). OCLC 762723768 (all editions).
- Henry, Odile (2003). "Femmes & Taylorisme: La Rationalisation du Travail Domestique" [Women & Taylorism: The Rationalization of Domestic Work]. Agone (in French) (28): 5. doi:10.4000/revueagone.402; OCLC 4659970814.
  The article is also included in a compilation book → Vincent, Béatrice, ed. (2003). Lutte des Sexes & Lutte des Classes [Gender Struggle & Class Struggle] (in French). Marseille: Éditions Agone. ISBN 2-7489-0003-0, 978-2-7489-0003-3; OCLC 491458578 (all editions).
- Hough, Jill Renee; White, Margaret Alice (September–October 2001). "Using Stories to Create Change: The Object Lesson of Frederick Taylor's 'Pig-Tale'". Journal of Management. 27 (5). SAGE Publications: 585–601. doi:10.1177/014920630102700505; ProQuest 197150631 (ABI/Inform Collection); ISSN 0149-2063; OCLC 5568698486, 4309090200.
- Hughes, Thomas Parke (1989). American Genesis – A Century of Invention and Technological Enthusiasm, 1870–1970. New York: Viking Press / Penguin Books. p. 190. ISBN 9780140097412 – via Internet Archive (Marygrove College). LCCN 89-39468; ISBN 0-1400-9741-4, 978-0-1400-9741-2; OCLC 1016217167 (all editions).
- Jaffe, William Julian (1957). L.P. Alford and the Evolution of Modern Industrial Management ("With an introduction by David B. Porter." See Leon Pratt Alford (1877–1942)). New York University Press – via HathiTrust (University of Michigan). LCCN 57-7915; OCLC 367967 (all editions).
- Kanigel, Robert (1997). The One Best Way: Frederick Winslow Taylor and the Enigma of Efficiency. New York: Viking Press. ISBN 978-0-670-86402-7 – via Internet Archive.
- Kipping, Matthias (October 1997). "Consultancies, Institutions and the Diffusion of Taylorism in Britain, Germany and France, 1920s to 1950s". Business History. 39 (4). Liverpool University Press, Routledge, Taylor & Francis: 67–83. doi:10.1080/00076799700000146. doi:10.1080/00076799700000146; ISSN 0007-6791; OCLC 4893274429.
  Kipping is a professor at the Schulich School of Business.
- Lepore, Jill (October 12, 2009). "Not So Fast – Scientific Management Started as a Way to Work. How Did It Become a Way of Life?". The New Yorker (book review → The Management Myth – Why the 'Experts' Keep Getting It Wrong, by Matthew Stewart). Vol. 85, no. 32. p. 114 (1st page). ProQuest 233147691; ISSN 0028-792X, ISSN 2163-3827; OCLC 5326941980.
  In 1908, Edwin Gay, a Harvard economics professor, visited Taylor in Philadelphia. Gay had been frustrated in his efforts to start a business school at Harvard: "I am constantly being told by businessmen that we cannot teach business." After meeting Taylor, Gay declared, "I am convinced that there is a scientific method involved in and underlying the art of business."
- Maier, Charles S. (1970). "Between Taylorism and Technocracy: European Ideologies and the Vision of Industrial Productivity in the 1920s". Journal of Contemporary History. 5 (2): 27–61. doi:10.1177/002200947000500202. JSTOR 259743. S2CID 162139561. JSTOR 259743; ISSN 0022-0094, OCLC 651663797, 5548943793, 5723522076.
- Mee, John Franklin (Spring 1988). "SAM – A Short History" (PDF). SAM Advanced Management Journal (re: Society for Advancement of Management. Diamond Anniversary issue). 53 (2): 5–12. EBSCOhost 4613584 (Business Premier database); ISSN 0749-7075; OCLC 8284291295.
  Mee wrote the article for SAM's Golden Anniversary issue → Mee, John Franklin (September 1963). "SAM – A Short History". Advanced Management Journal. 28. OCLC 311111459, OCLC 29085175, 11028187.
- Miami University (2003). "Frederick Winslow Taylor" (biographical essay). Oxford, Ohio. Archived from the original on November 24, 2003 – via Wayback Machine.
- Mintzberg, Henry, ed. (1989). Mintzberg on Management. New York: The Free Press. ISBN 9780029213711 – via Internet Archive. ISBN 978-1-4165-7319-7.
- Montgomery, David (1989). The Fall of the House of Labor: The Workplace, the State, and American Labor Activism, 1865–1925. Cambridge University Press. ISBN 9780521379823 – via Internet Archive (Boston Public Library).
  For the stories about Schmidt, Montgomery refers to → Wrege, Charles D.; Perroni, Amadeo G. (March 1974). "Taylor's Pig-Tale: A Historical Analysis of Frederick W. Taylor's Pig-Iron Experiments". Academy of Management Journal. 17 (1): 6–27. JSTOR 254767. doi:10.5465/254767; JSTOR 254767; ISSN 0001-4273; OCLC 5260887207, 5790939267.
- Nelson, Daniel Melvin (1980). Frederick W. Taylor and the Rise of Scientific Management (snippit view). University of Wisconsin Press – via Google Books. LCCN 79-5411; ISBN 0-2990-8160-5, 978-0-2990-8160-7; OCLC 6087867 (all editions).
- Papesh, Mary Ellen (February 14, 1998). "Frederick Winslow Taylor" (PDF) (student paper). Joliet, Illinois: University of St. Francis Business School.
- Pascale, Richard Tanner, ed. (1990). Managing on the Edge: How Successful Companies Use Conflict for Competitive Advantage (quoting Kōnosuke Matsushita). Simon and Schuster. p. 27. ISBN 9780671624422 – via Internet Archive. LCCN 89-48997; OCLC 316016475 (all editions).
- Gramsci, Antonio (1971) [1929–1935]. Hoare, Quintin; Smith, Geoffrey Nowell (eds.). Selections From the Prison Notebooks of Antonio Gramsci (11th printing). International Publishers – via Internet Archive. LCCN 71-168985 (1st ed.), LCCN 72-175271; ISBN 0-7178-0397-X; OCLC 185485941 (all editions).
- Gramsci, Antonio (1991–2011) [1929–1935]. Prison Notebooks [Quaderni del Carcere] (translated eds. – 1991, 1992, 1996, 2007, 2008, 2011 – by Joseph Anthony Buttigieg II; 1947–2019. See Prison Notebooks). (3 volumes). Columbia University Press. LCCN 91-22910; ISBN 0-2311-5755-X, 978-0-2311-5755-1 (2011 ed.); OCLC 210400186 (all editions)
1. Vol. 1 (1992 ed.) – via Google Books (limited preview). ISBN 0-2310-6082-3, 978-0-2310-6082-0.
2. Vol. 2 (not available online) (1992 ed.). ISBN 0-2311-0592-4, 978-0-2311-0592-7.
3. Vol. 3 (not available online) (1992 ed.). ISBN 978-0-2311-3944-1.
4. Vol. 3 (2007 ed.). 1992 – via Internet Archive (Trent University). ISBN 978-0-2311-3944-1.
- Rinehart, James W. (1975). The Tyranny of Work. Canadian Social Problems Series. Don Mills: Academic Press Canada. p. 44. ISBN 9780774730297 – via Internet Archive. LCCN 76-355264; ISBN 0-7747-3029-3; OCLC 2090135 (all editions).
- Roeber, Eugene Franz; Parmelee, Howard Coon (March 1909). "The High-Speed Tool-Steel Patent Decision". Electrochemical and Metallurgical Industry. 7 (3): 105–107 – via Google Books (University of Michigan Library).
  "The famous patent suit of the Bethlehem Steel company against the Niles-Bement-Pond Company for infringement of two fundamental patents of F. W. Taylor and M. White [Maunsel White III; 1856–1912] (668,369 and 668,270, both of Feb. 19, 1907,) has been decided in favor of the defendant ... "
  "The decision of the court emphasizes that there is no new composition of steel invented by Taylor and White."
- SAM – Society for Advancement of Management (link).
- Whitston, Kevin (Summer 1997). "The Reception of Scientific Management by British Engineers, 1890–1914". The Business History Review. 71 (2): 207–229. doi:10.2307/3116158. JSTOR 3116158. S2CID 145203181. OCLC 0007-6805; JSTOR 3116158; OCLC 5546532273, 5235438781.
- Wrege, Charles D.; Greenwood, Ronald G.; Hata, Sakae (1987). "The International Management Institute and Political Opposition to its Efforts in Europe, 1925–1934". Business and Economic History. CiteSeerX 10.1.1.392.2216. JSTOR 23702641; ISSN 0894-6825; OCLC 5792788126.
- Wren, Daniel Alan (June 8, 2015). "Implementing the Gantt Chart in Europe and Britain: The Contributions of Wallace Clark". Journal of Management History. 21 (3): 309–327. doi:10.1108/JMH-09-2014-0163. doi:10.1108/JMH-09-2014-0163; ISSN 1751-1348; OCLC 5911249398, 7054577907, 1014430228. Online here.
Secondary sources – news media
- New York Times (The) (June 15, 1883). "Stevens Institute Graduates – A Special Department of Applied Electricity to Be Established". The New York Times. Vol. 32, no. 9914. p. 8 – via TimesMachine.
- New York Times (The) (March 22, 1915). "F.W. Taylor, Expert in Efficiency, Dies". The New York Times. Vol. 64, no. 20876. p. 9 (col. 5) – via TimesMachine.
Also accessible via:
1. TimesMachine permalink.
2. Online reprint by the New York Times Leaning Network (online education blog) → "On This Day" (Times archive). March 20, 2018.
3. Newspapers.com.
"Frederick Winslow Taylor, originator of the modern scientific management movement ... "
- Wall Street Journal (The) (June 13, 1997). "Frederick Taylor, Early Century Management Consultant". p. A17. Archived from the original on May 14, 2008 – via Wayback Machine.
Primary sources
- Taylor, Frederick Winslow (1919) [1911]. The Principles of Scientific Management. Harper & Brothers – via Internet Archive (Prelinger Library). LCCN 11-10339; OCLC 233134 (all editions).
  The Principles of Scientific Management – via Project Gutenberg.
- Taylor, Frederick Winslow (1903). Shop Management. New York: American Society of Mechanical Engineers – via Internet Archive (Stanford University Libraries). OCLC 2365572 (all editions).
  Shop Management – via Project Gutenberg.
  Shop Management began as an address by Taylor to a meeting of the ASME, which published it in pamphlet form. The linked publication is a 1912 re-print.
- Taylor, Frederick Winslow (1947). Scientific Management – Comprising Shop Management [1903], The Principles of Scientific Management [1911], "Testimony Before the Special House Committee" [1912] (A Harper International Student Reprint). With introduction by Harlow Stafford Person (1875–1955). New York, Evanston, London: Harper & Row. LCCN 47-11978; OCLC 560540 (all editions).

== See also ==
- C. Bertrand Thompson
