= Schmidt (worker) =

Schmidt is a character in Principles of Scientific Management by Frederick Winslow Taylor. His true identity was Henry Noll.

In Principles, Taylor described how between 1898–1901 at Bethlehem Steel he had motivated Schmidt to increase his workload from carrying 12 tons of pig iron per day to 47 tons. He had done so by promising Schmidt a higher rate of pay for a level of output determined by management. For increasing his output by a factor of four, Schmidt earned 60% more pay.

Taylor's example of Schmidt is still taught widely in business and management education.

== Bethlehem context ==
Taylor recalled the context in his Principles of Scientific Management, his most famous volume to this day:

One of the first pieces of work undertaken by us, when the writer started to introduce scientific management into the Bethlehem Steel, was to handle pig iron on task work. The opening of the Spanish War found some 80,000 tons of pig iron placed in small piles in an open field adjoining the works. Prices for pig iron had been so low that it could not be sold at a profit, and it therefore had been stored. With the opening of the Spanish War the price of pig iron rose, and this large accumulation of iron was sold. This gave us a good opportunity to show the workmen, as well as the owners and managers of the works, on a fairly large scale the advantages of task work over the old-fashioned day work and piece work, in doing a very elementary class of work.

— F. W. Taylor

== Taylor's Schmidt speech ==
Taylor recalled the selection and test procedures, plus their outcome:

Our first step was to find the proper workman to begin with. We therefore carefully watched and studied these 75 men for three or four days, at the end of which time we had picked out four men who appeared to be physically able to handle pig iron at the rate of 47 tons per day. A careful study was then made of each of these men. We looked up their history as far back as practicable, and thorough inquiries were made as to the character, habits, and the ambition of each of them. Finally, we selected one from among the four as the most likely man to start with. He was a little Pennsylvania Dutchman who had been observed to trot back home for a mile or so after his work in the evening, about as fresh as he was when he came trotting down to work in the morning. We found that upon wages of $1.15 a day he had succeeded in buying a small plot of ground, and that he was engaged in putting up the walls of a little house for himself in the morning before starting to work and at night after leaving. He also had the reputation of being exceedingly close, that is, of placing a very high value on a dollar. As one man whom we talked to about him said, 'A penny looks about the size of a cartwheel to him.' This man we will call Schmidt.

The task before us, then, narrowed itself down to getting Schmidt to handle 47 tons of pig iron per day and making him glad to do it. This was done as follows. Schmidt was called out from among the gang of pig-iron handlers and talked to somewhat in this way:

Schmidt, are you a high-priced man?

Vell, I don't know vat you mean.

Oh yes. you do. What I want to know is whether you are a high-priced man or not.

Vell, I don't know vat you mean.

Oh, come now, you answer my questions. What I want to find out is whether you are a high-priced man or one of these cheap fellows here. What I want to find out is whether you want to earn $1.85 a day or whether you are satisfied With $1.15, just the same as all those cheap fellows are getting.

Did I vant $1.85 a day? Vas dot a high-priced man? Vell, yes, I vas a high-priced man.

Oh, you're aggravating me. Of course you want $1.85 a day — every one wants it! You know perfectly well that that has very little to do with your being a high-priced man. For goodness' sake answer my questions, and don't waste any more of my time. Now, come over here. You see that pile of pig iron?

Yes.'

You see that car?

Yes.

Well, if you are a high-priced man, you will load that pig iron on that car to-morrow for $1.85. Now do wake up and answer my question. Tell me whether you are a high-priced man or not.

Vell — did I got $1.85 for loading dot pig iron on dot car to-morrow?

Yes, of course you do, and you get $1.85 for loading a pile like that every day right through the year. That is what a high-priced man does, and you know it just as well as I do.

Vell, dot's all right. I could load dot pig iron on the car to-morrow for $1.85, and I get it every day, don't I?

Certainly you do — certainly you do.

Vell, den, I vas a high-priced man.

Now, hold on, hold on. You know just as well as I do that a high-priced man has to do exactly as he's told from morning till night. You have seen this man here before, haven't you?

No, I never saw him.

Well, if you are a high-priced man, you will do exactly as this man tells you to-morrow, from morning till night. When he tells you to pick up a pig and walk, you pick it up and you walk, and when he tells you to sit down and rest, you sit down. You do that right straight through the day. And what's more, no back talk. Now a high-priced man does just what he's told to do, and no back talk. Do you understand that? When this man tells you to walk, you walk; when he tells you to sit down, you sit down, and you don't talk back at him. Now you come on to work here to-morrow morning and I'll know before night whether you are really a high-priced man or not.

This seems to be rather rough talk. And indeed it would be if applied to an educated mechanic, or even an intelligent laborer. With a man of the mentally sluggish type of Schmidt it is appropriate and not unkind, since it is effective in fixing his attention on the high wages which he wants and away from what, if it were called to his attention, he probably would consider impossibly hard work.

What would Schmidt's answer be if he were talked to in a manner which is usual under the management of 'initiative and incentive'? say, as follows:

Now, Schmidt, you are a first-class pig-iron handler and know your business well. You have been handling at the rate of 12 tons per day. I have given considerable study to handling pig iron, and feel sure that you could do a much larger day's work than you have been doing. Now don't you think that if you really tried you could handle 47 tons of pig iron per day, instead of 12 tons?

What do you think Schmidt's answer would be to this?

Schmidt started to work, and all day long, and at regular intervals, was told by the man who stood over him with a watch, 'Now pick up a pig and walk. Now sit down and rest. Now walk — now rest,' etc. He worked when he was told to work, and rested when he was told to rest, and at half-past five in the afternoon had his 47 tons loaded on the car. And he practically never failed to work at this pace and do the task that was set him during the three years that the writer was at Bethlehem Steel. And throughout this time he averaged a little more than $1.85 per day, whereas before he had never received over $1.15 per day, which was the ruling rate of wages at that time in Bethlehem, Pennsylvania. That is, he received 60 per cent, higher wages than were paid to other men who were not working on task work. One man after another was picked out and trained to handle pig iron at the rate of 47 tons per day until all of the pig iron was handled at this rate, and the men were receiving 60 per cent. more wages than other workmen around them.

== Evidence of Taylor's view of workers ==
In his Prison Notebooks, Italian Marxist Antonio Gramsci attacked Taylor's characterisation of Schmidt's work as so devoid of intellectual content that it could be performed by an 'intelligent gorilla'. Harry Braverman subsequently attacked Taylor on the same point in Labor and Monopoly Capital, describing Taylor's statements as the 'explicit verbalization of the capitalist mode of production'.

Schmidt is sometimes cited as providing the evidence that Taylor viewed workers as solely motivated by money; one author has referred to Taylor's view of Schmidt as a 'greedy robot'.

== Schmidt's true identity ==
For decades it was unclear whether Schmidt had ever actually been a real person, or whether the experiments had succeeded as Taylor recalled.

In 1974 researchers revealed that Schmidt had indeed existed; his real name was Henry Noll. This research also revealed that Taylor had unreasonably extrapolated generalised conclusions from his experimental data.

== Comparisons with Schmidt ==
The most frequently made comparison with Schmidt is Alexey Stakhanov, who also massively increased his industrial output when suitably motivated. Some authors build a comparison between the two into a critique of the authority of workplace management under both capitalism and Soviet communism.

In his The Business of Genocide, historian Michael Thad Allen compared the sadistic way in which German concentration camp guards treated camp laborers lifting steel girders with the way Taylor had treated Schmidt at Bethlehem.

== Influence of Taylor's Schmidt story ==
Some authors have since argued that it does not necessarily matter whether Taylor's 'pig-tail' about Schmidt was entirely true. More importantly, it shows that stories about workplace change can be used to affect change elsewhere. Indeed, Taylor became very good at honing and refining his lectures, and audiences remembered them many years later.
