= Nature's God =

Nature's God may refer to:

- God in Deism, as used in the United States Declaration of Independence
- Nature god, or nature deity, a deity in charge of forces of nature
- Nature's God, a 1991 book by Robert Anton Wilson in The Historical Illuminatus Chronicles trilogy
- Nature’s God: The Heretical Origins of the American Republic, a 2014 book by Matthew Stewart
