= Christine Frederick =

American author and home economist

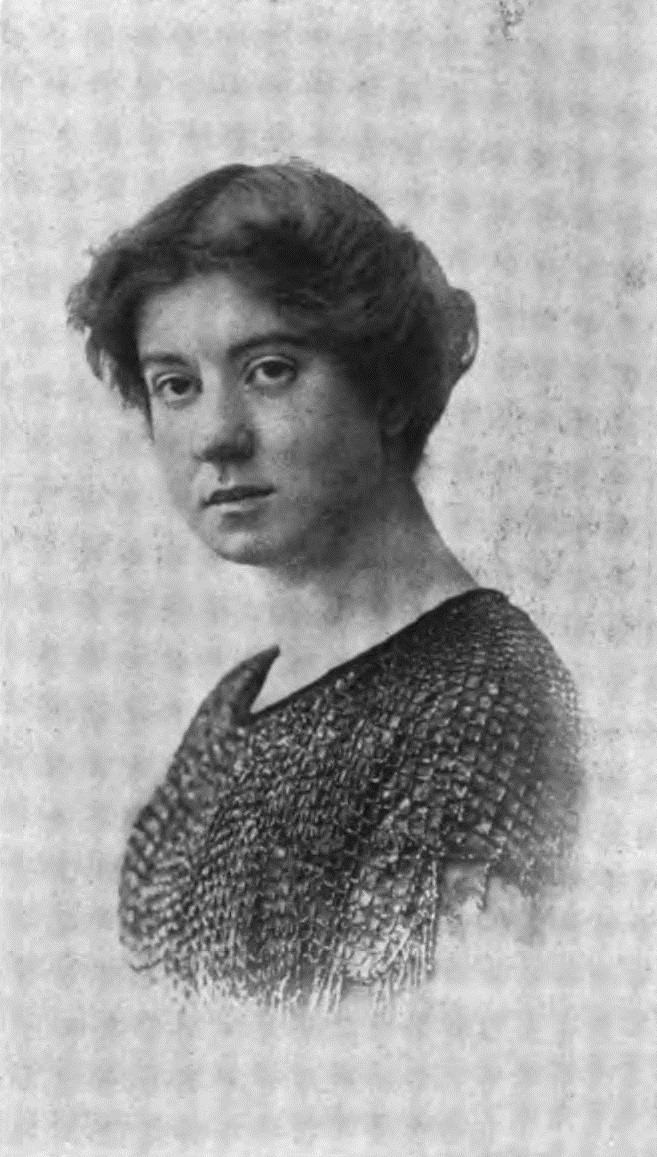
- Born: Christine Isobel Campbell; February 6, 1883; Boston, Massachusetts, U.S.
- Died: April 6, 1970 (aged 87)
- Other names: Christine McGaffey; Christine MacGaffey
- Occupations: Home economist, author
- Spouse(s): J. George Frederick (businessman); 4 children

Christine Frederick (February 6, 1883 – April 6, 1970) was an American home economist and early 20th century exponent of Taylorism as applied to the domestic sphere. She conducted experiments aimed at improving household efficiency, as well as arguing for women's vital role as consumers in a mass-production economy. She wrote books on these subjects, the best-known of which is probably Selling Mrs. Consumer, which offers an early justification for planned obsolescence as a necessary feature of the industrial economy.

== Early years ==
Christine Isobel Campbell was born in 1883 in Boston, Massachusetts, to Mimi (née Scott) and William R. Campbell, who separated shortly afterwards. In 1894 Frederick's mother married a lawyer, Wyatt MacGaffey, who adopted the girl.

In 1906, Christine McGaffey (as she preferred to spell her surname) graduated from Northwestern University and became a teacher. A year later, she married J. (Justus) George Frederick, a business executive interested in the theories of scientific management put forward by Frederick W. Taylor and others. The Fredericks had four children, David Mansfield, Jean, Phyllis, and Carol.

== Efficiency expert ==
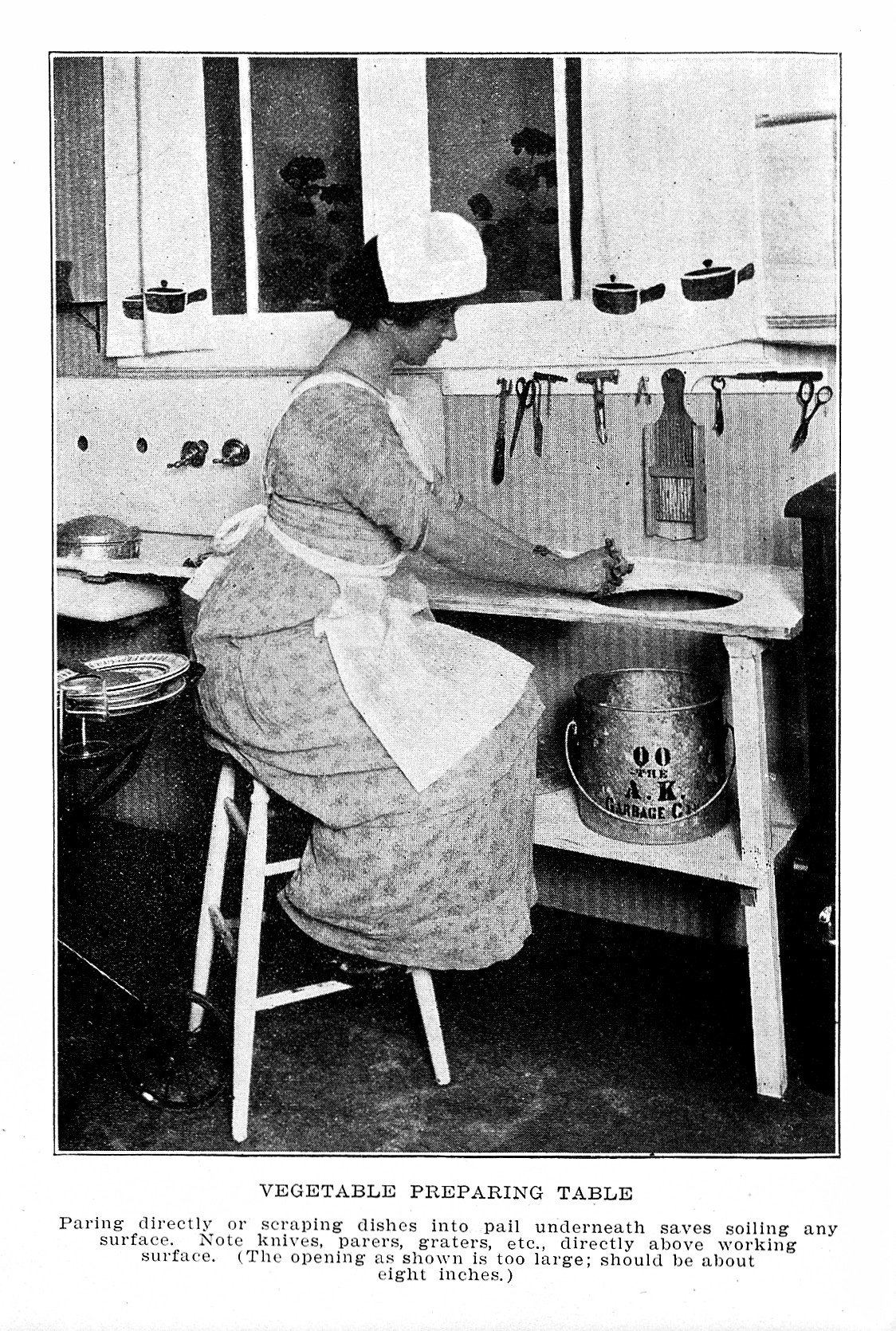
Photograph of "vegetable preparing table" from Christine Frederick's 1919 book Household Engineering.

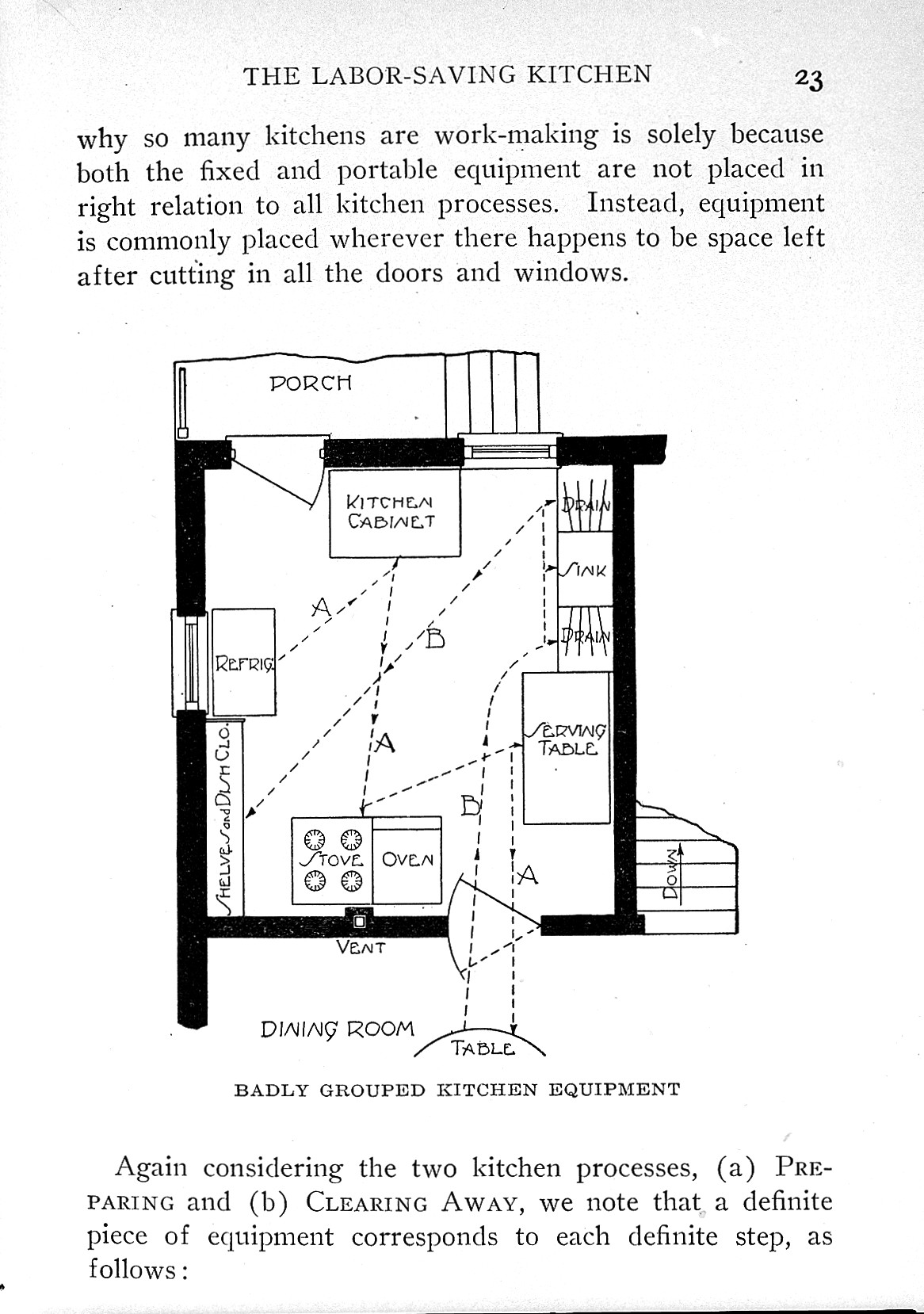
Diagram of inefficient kitchen from Christine Frederick's 1919 book Household Engineering.

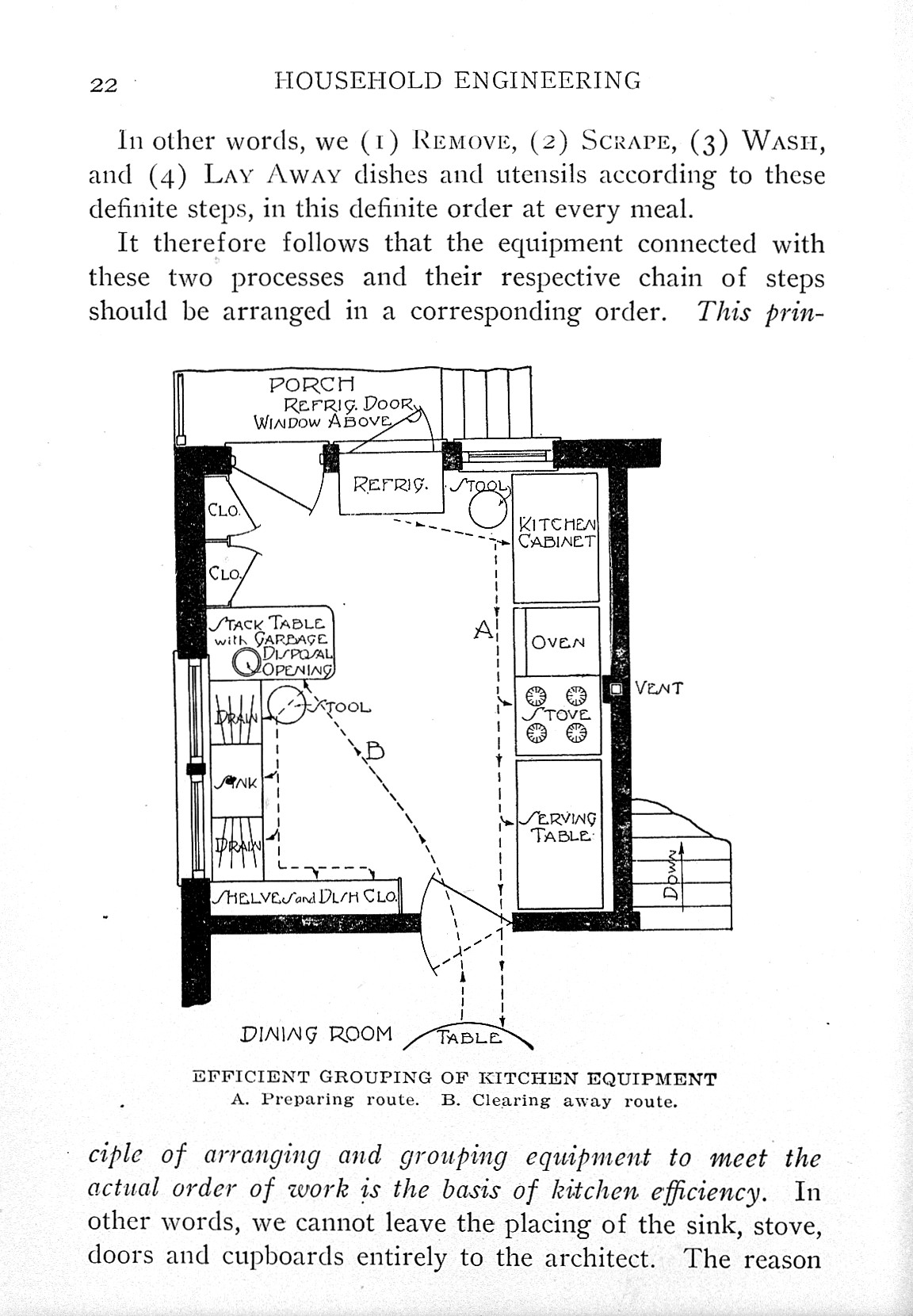
Efficient kitchen plan from Christine Frederick's 1919 book Household Engineering.

After moving to New York, Christine and J. George Frederick helped to found a club called the Advertising Women of New York in 1912 because women were refused admission to the men's advertising club. Becoming interested in Taylorism as applied to the domestic sphere, Frederick founded and directed a laboratory for conducting Taylorist experiments at her home in Greenlawn, New York.

She was especially interested in making kitchens more efficient for women and is credited with bringing about standardization of the height of kitchen counters and work surfaces. At the Applecroft Home Experiment Station, Frederick investigated some 1,800 different products from household appliances to food, looking for labor-saving methods of preparation and use.

In 1912, Frederick began a series of articles under the title 'New Housekeeping' in the Ladies' Home Journal (for which she served as consulting household editor) to explain Taylorism to middle-class women. These articles were subsequently published as a book, The New Housekeeping: Efficiency Studies in Home Management. Frederick's second chapter, on applying motion studies to household tasks, shows the clear parallel between her research and Taylor's well-known studies in the industrial sphere. She followed this up in 1915 with a correspondence course called Household Engineering: Scientific Management in the Home, which was published as a book of the same title in 1919. In 1917, she did some lecturing on the Chautauqua circuit.

Frederick inspired the French journalist Paulette Bernège, who became the leader of the Domestic Sciences movement in France in the inter-war years. Christine Frederick visited France in April 1927, where Bernège quickly arranged a meeting of the League for Household Efficiency, Association for Household Electric Appliances and Mon Chez Moi, at which the Minister of Housing presided.

Over the course of some thirty years, Frederick served as an editor for a number of other publications. She was home economics editor of Butterick Publishing Company's magazine The Designer, as well as a consulting editor for Shrine and the American Weekly. She also earned money (as well as gaining publicity) by promoting specific products under the banner of home efficiency.

Frederick sometimes worked with her husband, who was president of a company called Business Bourse that specialized in publishing business-related research and data. In the 1920s, the Fredericks broadened their views to embrace the idea of planned product obsolescence as a form of large-scale efficiency. Rejecting the traditional idea that products should be made to last, they argued instead for obsolescence as a kind of ‘creative waste’ that kept the industrial economy running smoothly. In this view, well-made, long-lasting objects are a problem because they saturate the market, creating resistance to the efficiencies of mass production. In Advertising the American Dream, Roland Marchand calls the Fredericks 'evangelists of the new ideology' of planned obsolescence. In 1929 she stated "The American advertiser has taught the American housewife to think constructively of her job".

== Death ==
Christine Frederick died of heart disease in 1970 at the age of 87. Her papers are held in the Radcliffe Institute's Schlesinger Library.

== Selected publications ==
- Meals that Cook Themselves and Cut the Costs. Sentinel Manufacturing, New Haven, 1915.
- The New Housekeeping: Efficiency Studies in Home Management. Doubleday, Page & Co., Garden City, N.Y., 1918.
- Household Engineering: Scientific Management in the Home. American School of Home Economics, Chicago, 1923.
- Selling Mrs. Consumer. Business Bourse, New York, 1929.
