= Charles D. Wrege =

American historian

Charles D. Wrege (March 11, 1924 – August 19, 2014) was an American management historian, and Professor at Rutgers University. He is known for his contributions to management history, especially his critical work on Frederick W. Taylor and scientific management.

== Biography ==
Born and raised in Newark, New Jersey, Wrege attended Newark Arts High School. In World War II he joined the United States Army Air Forces, where he was deployed to the Pacific Theater and served as photographer in the Twentieth Air Force.

Back in the States after the war, he started his studies at the New Mexico Highlands University. Later on he moved back East, and obtained his AB in 1952 at the Upsala College. Next at The New School he had participated in the Asch conformity experiments, and in 1955 obtained his MA in Experimental Psychology. In 1956 he obtained his M.B.A. at the New York University, where in 1961 he also obtained his Ph.D. under John Glover.

In 1952, Wrege had started his career as industrial engineer at the Weston Electric Light Company in Newark, New Jersey. After his graduation at The New School he joined the faculty of the New York University at its School of Commerce. After his graduation in 1961 he moved to the Rutgers University, where he spend the rest of his academic career until his retirement in 1991.

Wrege died on August 19, 2014, at his home in Spring Lake, New Jersey.

== Work ==
=== Facts and fallacies of Hawthorne, 1961 ===
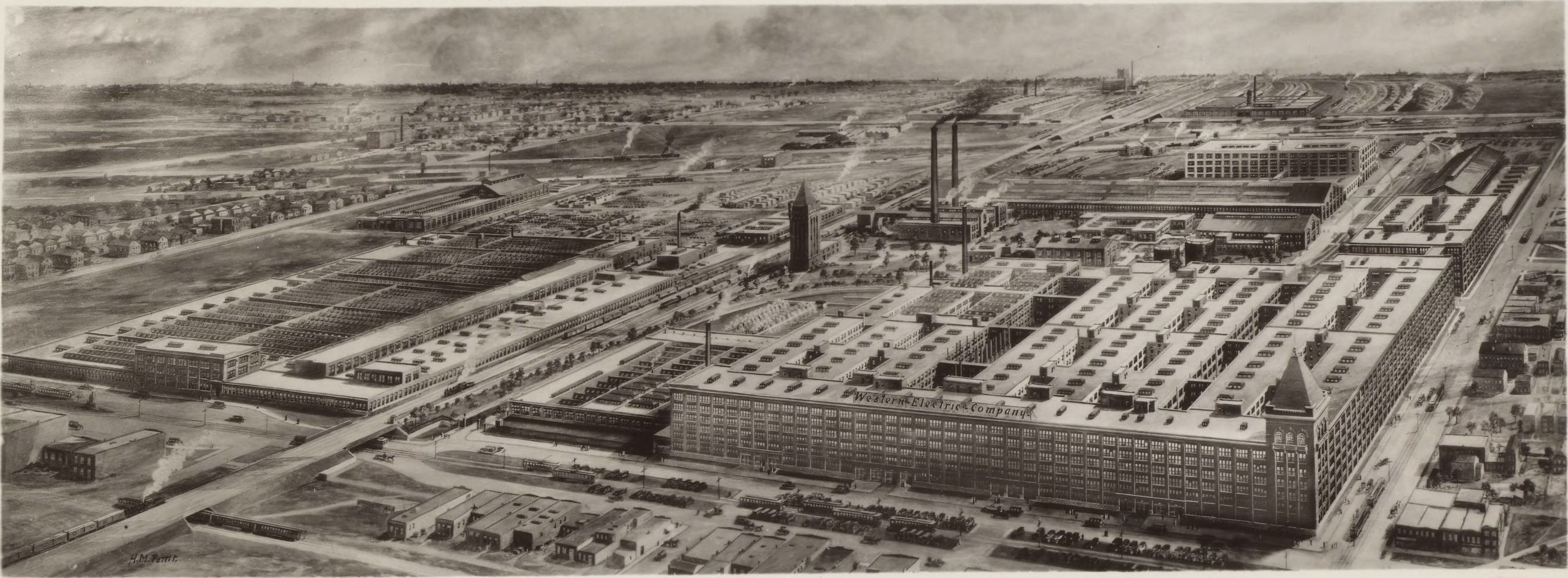
Hawthorne Works in the late 1920s.

Wrege wrote his PhD thesis at the New York University about the Hawthorne studies conducted by Elton Mayo and others in the 1920s and 1930s at the Hawthorne Works in Cicero, Illinois. Wrege published his findings in 1961 and his work was republished in 1986 by Garland publisher in New York.

Wrege conducted a historical study of the Hawthorne illumination tests, one of the earliest studies at the Hawthorne works that studied the effect of light levels on worker productivity. Wrege looked at the origins, procedures, and results of these early studies and their influence upon the later Hawthorne studies.

In his later years Wrege supplied Steven D. Levitt and John A. List with unpublished information and background data for their research later published in the 2011 article "Was There Really a Hawthorne Effect at the Hawthorne Plant?."

=== F.W. Taylor and the principles of scientific management ===
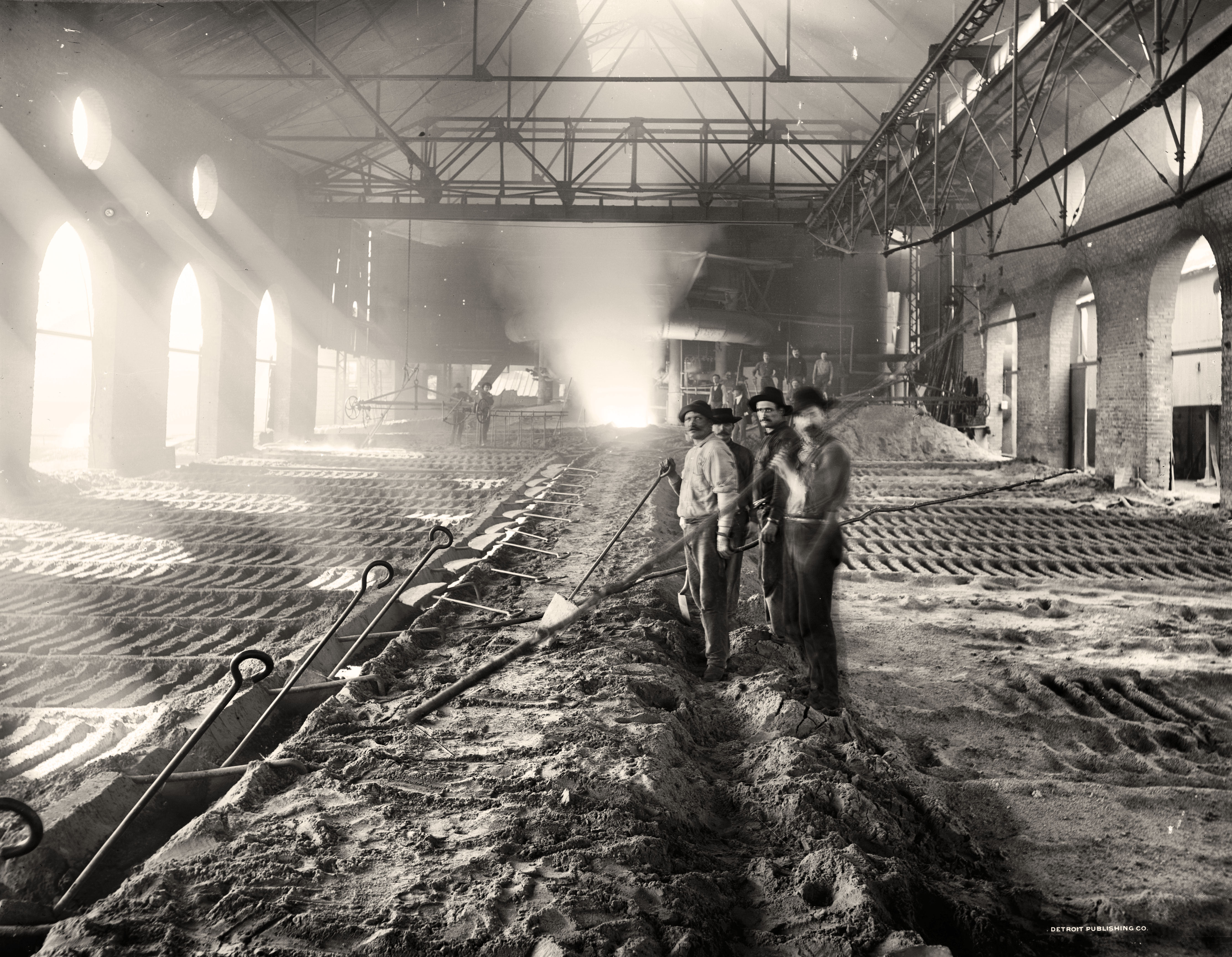
Casting pig iron, Iroquois smelter, Chicago, between 1890 and 1901.

In the 1970s Wrege conducted further research into the origins of scientific management, especially on the pig-iron experiments by Frederick W. Taylor's. The pig-iron experiments on the loading of pig-iron were conducted by Taylor in 1899. Wrege and Perroni (1974) found out that

[Taylor's] account of the loading of pig-iron has been accepted virtually without question. An investigation of that story reveals it to be more fiction than fact.

They even concluded:

Whether imaginative or impudent, the fact is that Taylor seems to have believed that the end justified the means. This philosophy was not morally acceptable during his period, and it is certainly not part of the standards of morality of our own.

In 1991 Wrege and a colleague management historian Ron Greenwood (d. 1995) published a more general work on the myth and reality of Frederick W. Taylor as father of scientific management.

=== Graphic history of Scientific Management 1856–1929 ===
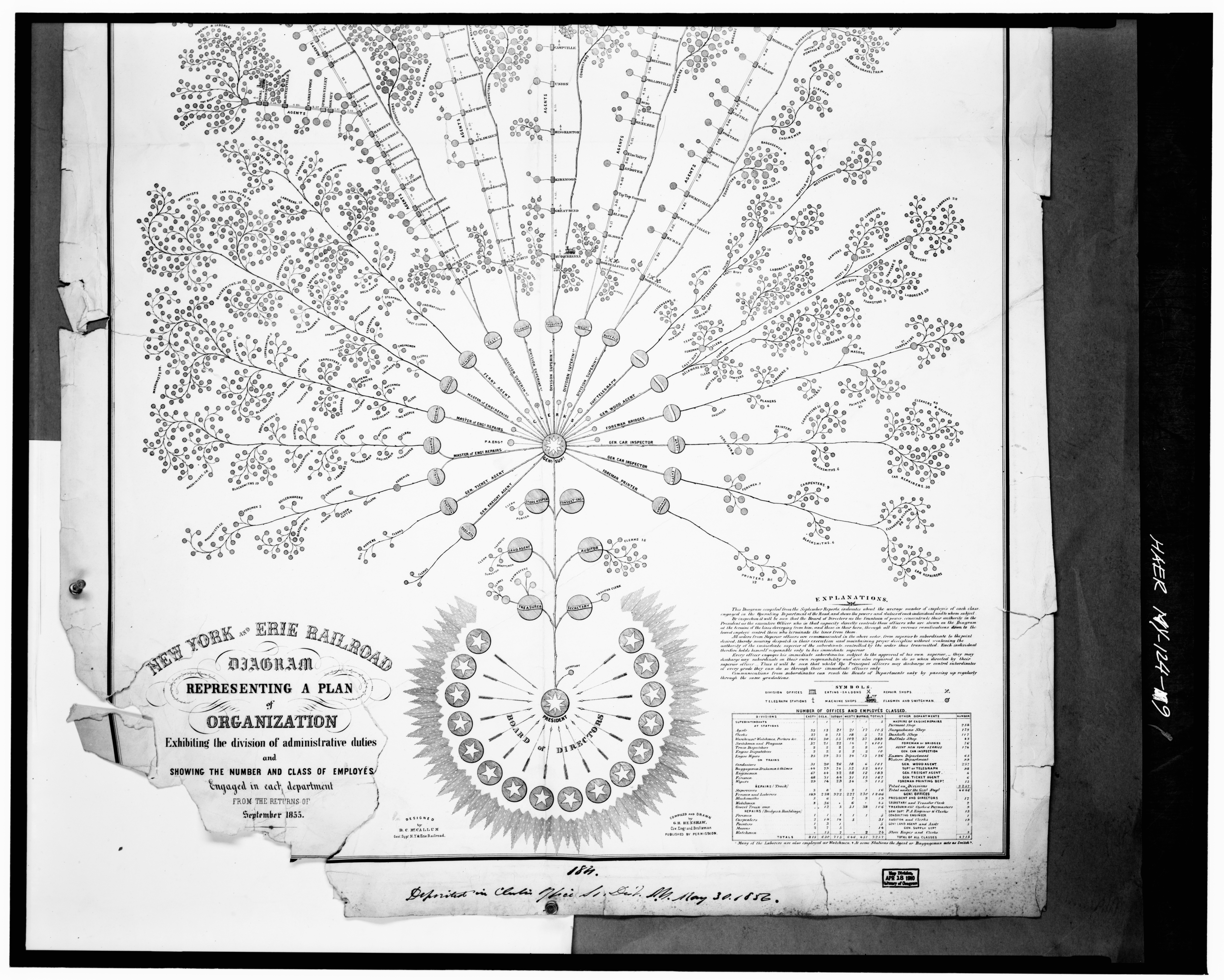
Bottom half of organization diagram of the New York and Erie Railroad, 1855–56

During his historical studies of scientific management, Wrege developed a growing interest in the graphic history of Scientific Management, which he dated from 1856 to 1929. The year of 1856 apparently signified the origin, and this is the same year in which Daniel McCallum published the first modern organizational chart of the New York & Erie Railroad drawn by George Holt Henshaw.

This organizational chart was thought lost for years, until Alfred D. Chandler Jr. had suggested its existence. Chandler had unsuccessfully searched for it, which inspired Wrege to follow into his footsteps. After many years of research Wrege and Guidon Sorbo Jr. (1950 - ) located one last specimen at the Library of Congress in 2005 (see image).

== Selected publications ==
- Charles D. Wrege, Facts and Fallacies of Hawthorne, Doctoral Dissertation. 1961; republished 1986.
- Wrege, Charles D., and Ronald G. Greenwood. Frederick W. Taylor, the father of scientific management: myth and reality. Irwin Professional Pub, 1991.

Articles, a selection

- Wrege, Charles D., and Amedeo G. Perroni. "Taylor's pig-tale: A historical analysis of Frederick W. Taylor's pig-iron experiments." Academy of Management Journal 17.1 (1974): 6–27.
- Wrege, Charles D. "Solving Mayo's Mystery: The First Complete Account of the Origin of the Hawthorne Studies-The Forgotten Contributions of CE Snow and H. Hibarger." Academy of Management Proceedings. Vol. 1976. No. 1. Academy of Management, 1976.
- Wrege, Charles D., and Anne Marie Stotka. "Cooke creates a classic: the story behind FW Taylor's principles of scientific management." Academy of Management Review 3.4 (1978): 736–749.
- Wrege, Charles D., Regina A. Greenwood, and Sakae Hata. "What we do not know about management history: Some categories of research and methods to uncover management history mysteries." Journal of Management History 5.7 (1999): 414–424.
- Wrege, Charles D., and Richard M. Hodgetts. "Frederick W. Taylor's 1899 pig iron observations: Examining fact, fiction, and lessons for the new millennium." Academy of Management Journal 43.6 (2000): 1283–1291.
