= The Business of Genocide =

Book about Nazi crimes

The Business of Genocide: The SS, Slave Labor, and the Concentration Camps
- Author: Michael Thad Allen
- Language: English
- Genre: Non-fiction
- Publication date: 2002
- Publication place: University of North Carolina Press
- ISBN: 9780807826775

The Business of Genocide: The SS, Slave Labor, and the Concentration Camps is a book by Michael Thad Allen which focuses on the SS Main Economic and Administrative Office and its role in the Nazi concentration camps and slave labor of Nazi Germany.
