= Journal of Management Inquiry =

- Discipline: Management
- Language: English
- Edited by: Richard W. Stackman, Pablo Martin de Holan

Publication details
- History: 1992-present
- Publisher: SAGE Publications
- Frequency: Quarterly
- Impact factor: 3.1 (2022)

Standard abbreviations
- ISO 4: J. Manag. Inq.

Indexing
- ISSN: 1056-4926 (print); 1552-6542 (web)
- LCCN: 92644038
- OCLC no.: 23725363

Links
- Journal homepage; Online access; Online archive

The Journal of Management Inquiry is a quarterly peer-reviewed academic journal that publishes papers in the field of management with an emphasis on qualitative research, inductive reasoning and "non-traditional" research, and thought-provoking articles meant to generate academic conversations in their field. The journal's editors-in-chief are Richard W. Stackman (University of San Francisco) and Pablo Martin De Holan (HEC Paris). It was established in 1992 and is currently published by SAGE Publications. It is the official journal of the Western Academy of Management, an independent affiliate of the Academy of Management.

== Sections ==
The journal has five regular sections:

"Generative Curiosity", which introduces ideas with the aim to encourage further scholarly interest, conversation, and collaboration;

"Non-traditional Research" which publishes alternative theoretical frameworks and views, methods, and data sources;

"Dialogues" which publishes academic conversations on current topics on Organization and Management Theory;

"Provocations & Provocateurs", offering insights through the use of alternative modes of expression whose common theme is to be outside the generally accepted boundaries of the field; and

"Six Degrees" is a section that explores the collaborations that have produced seminal contributions to management in a podcast format.

== Abstracting and indexing ==
The journal is abstracted and indexed in Current Contents/Social & Behavioral Sciences, EBSCO databases, Scopus, and the Social Sciences Citation Index. According to the Journal Citation Reports, its 2022 impact factor is 3.1, and it is ranked 162nd out of 227 management journals. It is listed as an A journal in the Australian Business Deans Council ABDC journal quality list.
