= Léon Guillet =

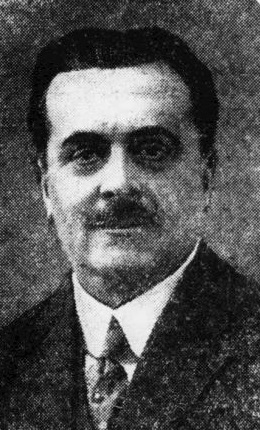

Léon Alexandre Guillet (11 July 1873 – 9 May 1946) was a French metallurgist who studied the properties of metal alloys and developed martensitic and austenitic stainless steels. He served as a professor of metallurgy at the École Centrale Paris where he was a director from 1923 and played a key role in putting materials research on a scientific footing.

Guillet was born in Saint Nazaire (Loire Atlantique) and in 1894 he went to the school of art and manufacture where he met Henri Le Chatelier who guided him. His doctoral thesis was on aluminium alloys and the work was done at Dion-Bouton and at Le Chatelier's laboratory in the Ecole des Mines. He then became a consultant at Dion-Bouton and worked with several companies. In 1906 he went to teach metallurgy and became a full professor in 1908 and worked there until 1942 while also consulting in the industry. In 1923 he became director of the school of arts and manufacture where he brought major changes including a foundation in scientific theories in engineering. During World War I he was involved in the design and manufacture of artillery shells. During World War II, in 1939, he was again put in charge of naval artillery at the Ruelle Foundry in Angoulême as honorary artillery lieutenant-colonel. Guillet published his major metallurgical works including Traité de métallurgie génerale (1922), Les méthodes d'étude des alliages métalliques (1923), and Trempe, recuit, revenue (2 volumes, 1928–1931). He examined steels made with nickel, manganese, chromium, tungsten, as well as copper and aluminium alloys. He examined the heat treatment of alloys.

Guillet was elected to the Academy of Sciences in 1925, proposed by Le Chatelier. Guillet married Marie Béatrice Edwidge Soulier in 1898 and they had a daughter and a son, Léon Pierre Adolphe Guillet (1908–1991), who also became a metallurgist.
