= Matthew Stewart (philosopher) =

American philosopher and author (born 1963)

- Born: Honolulu, Hawaii
- Occupation: Author (non-fiction)
- Writing career
- Subjects: Philosophy, History
- Website: mwstewart.com

Matthew Stewart is an American philosopher and author currently living in the Boston, Massachusetts area. He is the author of The 9.9 Percent, Nature's God, The Management Myth, The Courtier and the Heretic, Monturiol's Dream, and The Truth About Everything. He graduated from Princeton University in 1985 with a concentration in political philosophy and was awarded the Sachs Scholarship from Princeton for study at Oxford University, where he earned a D.Phil. in philosophy in 1988. He worked as a management consultant prior to writing full-time.

== Bibliography ==
Year	Title	Publisher	Subject
2024	An Emancipation of the Mind: Radical Philosophy, the War over Slavery, and the Refounding of America	W. W. Norton & Company	Slavery in the United States
2021	The 9.9 Percent: The New Aristocracy That Is Entrenching Inequality and Warping Our Culture	Simon & Schuster	Wealth inequality, Distribution of wealth
2014	Nature’s God: The Heretical Origins of the American Republic	W. W. Norton & Company	Politics of the United States
2009	The Management Myth: Debunking the Modern Philosophy of Business	W. W. Norton & Company	Management, Management consulting
2006	The Courtier and the Heretic: Leibniz, Spinoza, and the Fate of God in the Modern World	W. W. Norton & Company	Gottfried Wilhelm Leibniz, Baruch Spinoza
2004	Monturiol’s Dream: The Extraordinary Story of the Submarine Inventor Who Wanted to Save the World	Pantheon Books	Narcís Monturiol
1997	The Truth About Everything: An Irreverent History of Philosophy	Prometheus Books	Philosophy
