= Business guru =

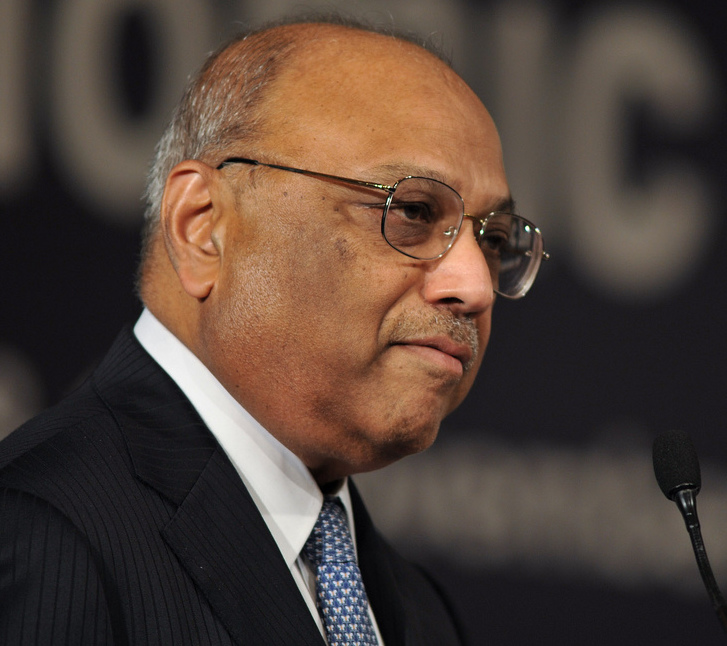
C. K. Prahalad (1941–2010), originator of the core competency concept, ranked first among influential modern business gurus on Stuart Crainer's and Des Dearlove's biennial Thinkers50 list, in 2009.

A business guru is a manager that can be defined as 'a person with influential ideas or theories about business'. The earliest use of the term business guru can be tracked back to the 1960s being used in Business Week. There are no existing qualifications that make someone a business guru. Anyone can become a business guru by making impact in a particular industry. It's also possible to claim to be a business guru at any time. It's not a title. The lists of people who have been accepted as business gurus have constantly changed over time. However, there are some people who have been accepted by a great majority as a business guru and also some organizations which have created their own lists of gurus. One English writer has described management gurus as "overwhelmingly a US phenomenon."

== Examples and lists ==
There is no definitive list of business gurus, but some writers have proposed "personal" lists. These lists are mostly created by organizations such as business magazines or management writers. There have been many business guru lists created through history.

A list consisting of people who are included in almost all of the lists created, collectively known as the "Famous Five", are: Frederick Winslow Taylor, Michael Porter, Alfred Sloan, Peter Drucker, and Douglas McGregor.

In 2001, Harvard Business Review asked the gurus to name their favorite gurus. The people named were Peter Drucker, James March and Herbert Simon.

Another list includes Peter Drucker, Michael Porter, and Tom Peters as the three leading gurus of our time.

There are also many gurus who have emerged and disappeared through history. Fordism - named for Henry Ford - ranked alongside Frederick Winslow Taylor's Taylorism in the early-20th century. A Russian tradition commemorates Lavrentiy Beria (executed in 1953 despite having run the massive Gulag organisation and the Soviet atomic bomb project) as the "best manager of the 20th century. In Germany, Reinhard Hôhn became the postwar management guru. The Japanese were known for making improvements to the business world and producing gurus in the 1980s, including Keniche Ohmae and Akio Morita. Then European gurus emerged, such as Yves Doz, Geert Hofstede, Manfred Kets De Vries and Charles Handy.

== Criticisms of "guru" status ==
One management expert, Gary Hamel, says there have been "few genuine breakthroughs" since the work of Taylor and Max Weber. In his book, Hamel says that management is "stuck in a time warp." Similarly, even one of the authors of a book about management gurus warns that management theory is "not served well by fads," citing Enron as a "management fad for its supposed culture of innovation."

== See also ==
- Businessperson
- Religion and business
- Technology evangelist
- Evangelism marketing
