= Subir Chowdhury =

Bangladeshi author

- সুবীর চৌধুরী
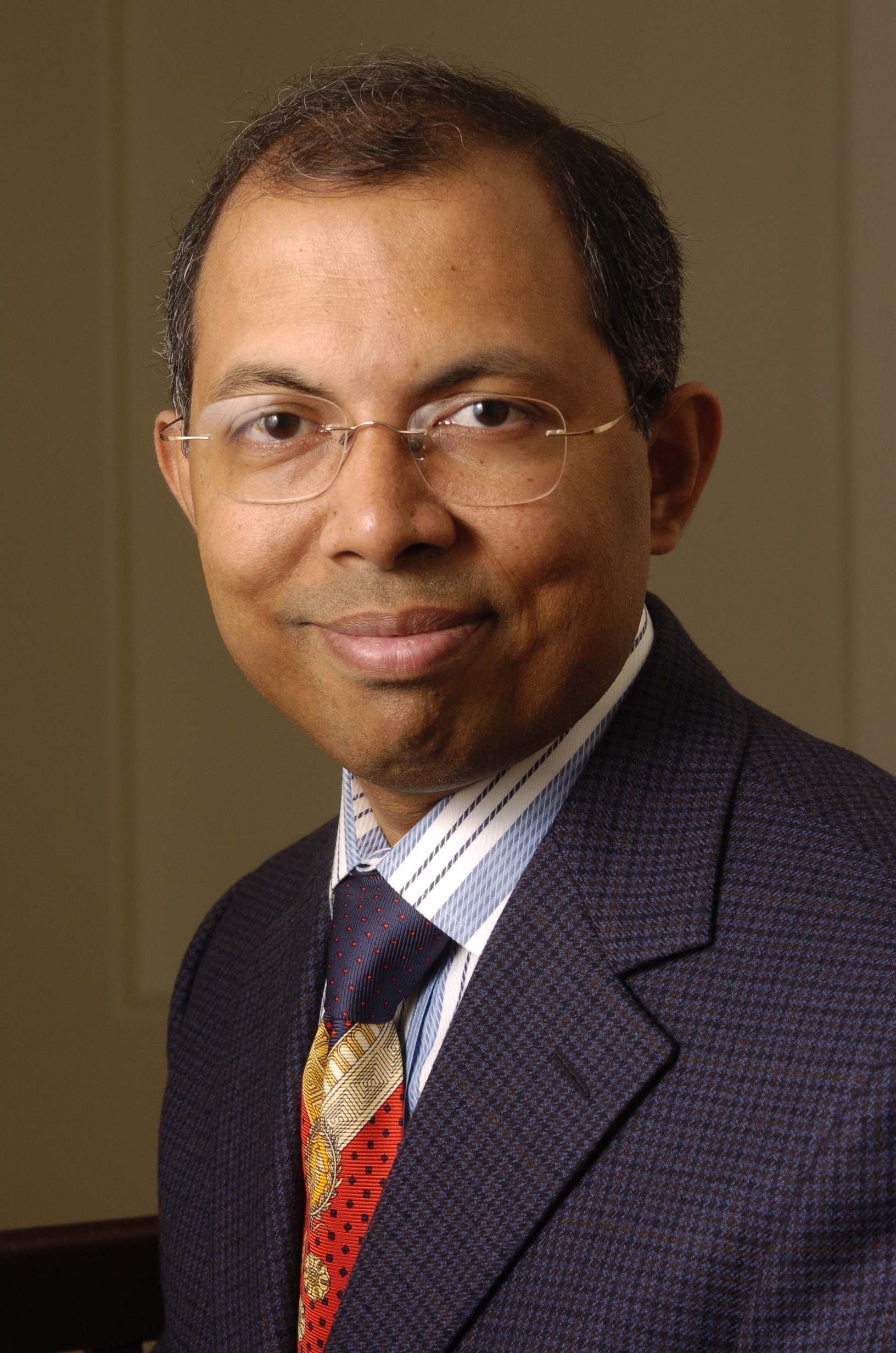
- Chowdhury in December 2009
- Born: 12 January 1967 (age 59)
- Occupations: Author, management consultant
- Spouse: Malini Chowdhury
- Website: www.subirchowdhury.com

Subir Chowdhury (Bengali: সুবীর চৌধুরী; born 12 January 1967) is a Bangladeshi-American author of 15 books and noted for his work in quality and management. He is currently the chairman and CEO of ASI Consulting Group, LLC, in Bingham Farms, Michigan.

== Early life and education ==
Born in Chittagong, Bangladesh, Chowdhury received his undergraduate degree in aeronautical engineering from the Indian Institutes of Technology (IIT) in Kharagpur, India (from which he received the Distinguished Alumnus Award) and a graduate degree in industrial management from Central Michigan University, Mt. Pleasant, Michigan where he also received the Distinguished Alumnus Award. He came to the United States in 1991 and became a naturalized U.S. citizen in 2004.

== History ==
Chowdhury started his career as a quality and systems engineer assigned to General Motors' Delphi Division in 1993. From 1998 to 2003 Chowdhury worked as an executive vice president of the American Supplier Institute, which at the time was a provider of technical training for mostly automotive manufacturing companies in the U.S.

In 1996, Chowdhury co-authored with Ken Zimmer a book titled QS-9000 Pioneers. The book was an early effort to demonstrate how companies "revitalized" their manufacturing practices with standardized quality management processes. According to the book jacket, the book was endorsed by quality management experts Dr. Armand Fiegenbaum, Philip B. Crosby, J.D. Power III, and Dr. Genichi Taguchi.

Joining American Supplier Institute in 1997, Chowdhury began to work with his mentor Dr. Genichi Taguchi, developer of robust engineering theory, and Taguchi's son, Shin Taguchi who is also an engineer. Together, they co-authored a book titled Robust Engineering (2000) that was designed to help producers bring products to market at a faster rate and at lower cost, and yet maintain a high level of quality.

Inspired by a book titled The Leader of the Future, Chowdhury began collaborating with other management thinkers to analyze leadership and organizational development. Management 21C was published in 2000 with contributions from Peter Senge, C K Prahalad, James Kouzes, Barry Z. Posner, Sumantra Ghoshall, Christopher A. Bartlett, and Rosabeth Moss Kanter.

The Six Sigma quality movement was reaching its height in popularity in 2001 when Chowdhury wrote his next book, The Power of Six Sigma. Reported as a bestselling nonfiction book, some reviewers noted that Chowdhury made complex topics quality management issues easy to understand by using a fictionalized story to model important concepts.

Continuing the collaborations he began with Management 21C, Chowdhury completed work on Organization 21C, published in 2002. According to the book, his goal was to present ideas and strategic solutions to "guide, influence and help" individuals and organizations with management and leadership challenges. Among the contributors listed are Richard E. Boyatzis, James A. Champy, Allan R. Cohen, Jay A. Conger, Samuel A. Culbert, Christopher DeRose, Dexter Dunphy, David Finegold, Elizabeth Florent-Treacy, Rob Goffee, Robert L. Heneman, Harvey A. Hornstein, Andrew, Kakabadse, Manfred F. R. Kets de Vries, Edgar H. Schein, and Noel M. Tichy.

In 2002, Chowdhury wrote two more books on Six Sigma. Design for Six Sigma helped draw attention to emerging DFSS methodology that simplifies an otherwise complex management theory. The follow-up book The Power of Design for Six Sigma, stood out because unlike other books on the topic, Chowdhury successfully engaged a broad audience that included assembly line workers and CEOs to make Six Sigma even more accessible. These books lead Chowdhury to create a management implementation system he called "LEO" (Listen-Enrich-Optimize). This concept was later highlighted his book The Ice Cream Maker (2005) and later expanded in The Power of LEO (2011). His latest book is Robust Optimization (2016) co-authored with Shin Taguchi.

In 2003, Chowdhury formed ASI Consulting Group, LLC and became its chairman and CEO.

From 2011, Chowdhury and his wife, Malini, began a foundation that has seeded several programs at major universities in India, the U.S., and the U.K. The latest in this work is at the Indian Institute of Technology, an inter-disciplinary school on Quality and Reliability (Q&R), which is the first of its kind in India.

In 2017, Chowdhury published his 15th book titled The Difference: When Good Enough Isn't Enough.

== Education and philanthropic work ==
Indian Institute of Technology (IIT) Kharagpur, India

The Subir Chowdhury School of Quality and Reliability has been created for all IIT students who desire academic training in the concepts of quality assurance. The school was inspired by Chowdhury who is an IIT alumnus. Modules on quality and reliability are designed on engineering processes and their impact on environment and life in general.

London School of Economics and Political Science

The Subir Chowdhury Fellowship on Quality and Economics Fellow is expected to complete publishable research on people quality and behaviour of the economies of Asian nations "prioritising, but not restricted to, India and Bangladesh." The fellowship is awarded annually.

Harvard University

The Subir Chowdhury Fellowship on Quality and Economics Fellow is expected to engage in research examining the impact of people and process quality on the economic advancement of the United States. This is a graduate Fellowship for the graduate students in the Harvard University to be given annually.

University of Southern California (USC)

The Chowdhury Prize is an annual international mid-career prize for writers, presented at the University of Southern California through the auspices of the Subir and Malini Chowdhury Foundation and in collaboration with Kenyon College and The Kenyon Review. The prize seeks to identify authors who are at an inflection point, with a body of work already behind them, but also with significant future potential.

University of California, Berkeley

The Subir and Malini Chowdhury Center for Bangladesh Studies was established at University of California, Berkeley, January 2014. The center's mission is to the build ties between institutions in Bangladesh and the University of California. It will also conduct research, promote art and culture, and offer three scholarships, namely: The Subir Chowdhury Fellowship on Quality of Life in Bangladesh for graduate students; The Malini Chowdhury Fellowship on Bangladesh Studies for graduate students in any field that concentrates on Bangladesh studies; and The Subir Chowdhury Undergraduate Scholarship awarded to students concentrating in South and Southeast Asian Studies at Berkeley with matching awards from the Ford Challenge, a fund provided by a Berkeley donor to match undergraduate scholarship gifts.

Global Quality Awareness (GQA)

A non-profit initiative of the Subir and Malini Chowdhury Foundation created to improve the lives of individuals and their communities around the world by promoting a personal understanding of, and commitment to a "Quality mindset".

Frances Hesselbein Medal for Excellence in Leadership and Service

Subir and Malini Chowdhury Foundation provided a lifetime endowment for the award, given annually to a West Point cadet who best exhibits excellence in mentorship and leadership by example at the United States Military Academy at West Point

== Personal life ==
Chowdhury is married to Malini Chowdhury. They have one son, Anish Chowdhury and one daughter, Anandi Chowdhury.

== Bibliography ==
Books

- The Difference: When Good Enough Isn't Enough, Crown Business Books, 2017. ISBN 978-0451496218
- Robust Optimization: World's Best Practices for Developing Winning Vehicles, with Shin Taguchi; Wiley, 2016. ISBN 978-1119212126
- The Power of LEO: The Revolutionary Process for Achieving Extraordinary Results; McGraw-Hill, 2011. ISBN 978-0071767996
- The Ice Cream Maker; Doubleday, Random House, 2006. ISBN 978-0385514781
- Next Generation Business Handbook; Wiley, 2006. ISBN 978-0471669968
- Taguchi's Quality Engineering Handbook, with Genichi Taguchi, Yuin Wu; Wiley, 2004. ISBN 978-0471413349
- The Power of Design For Six Sigma; Kaplan Publishing, 2002. ISBN 978-0793160600
- Organization 21C; Financial Times - Prentice Hall, 2002. ISBN 978-0130603142
- Design For Six Sigma; Kaplan Professional, 2002. ISBN 978-0793152247
- The Talent Era: Achieving a High Return on Talent; Financial Times - Prentice Hall, 2001. ISBN 978-0130410405
- The Power of Six Sigma; Dearborn Trade, 2001. ISBN 978-0793144341
- The Mahalanobis-Taguchi System, with Genichi Taguchi, Yuin Wu; McGraw-Hill, 2000. ISBN 978-0071362634
- Management 21C; Financial Times Prentice Hall, 2000. ISBN 978-0273639633
- Robust Engineering, with Genichi Taguchi, Shin Taguchi; McGraw-Hill, 1999. ISBN 978-0071347822
- QS-9000 Pioneers, with Ken Zimmer; McGraw-Hill, 1996. ISBN 978-0786308651

== Awards and honors ==
- THINKERS50 HALL OF FAME by Thinkers50
- SME Albert M. Sargent Progress Award by the Society of Manufacturing Engineers (SME)
- ASME Soichiro Honda Medal by the American Society for Mechanical Engineers (ASME)
- ASQ Distinguished Service Medal (DSM) by the American Society for Quality
- Arnold W. Siegel Humanitarian Award by the SAE International
- Mensforth Manufacturing Gold Medal by the Institution of Engineering and Technology (IET), UK
- Outstanding American by Choice Award U.S. Government, DHS/USCIS.
- Heritage Hall of Fame by the International Institute Foundation, Detroit, Michigan.
- Philip B. Crosby Medal given by the ASQ (American Society of Quality) - First recipient of this international medal.
- SME Gold Medal presented by the SME (Society of Manufacturing Engineers).
- Henry Ford II Distinguished Award for Excellence in Automotive Engineering awarded by the SAE (Society of Automotive Engineers).
- Young Leadership and Excellence Award presented by the Automotive Hall of Fame.
- ASEI Engineer of the Year Award in 1998 by the American Society of Engineers of Indian Origin (ASEI).
- Outstanding Young Manufacturing Engineer of the Year Award in 1997 by the Society of Manufacturing Engineers (SME).
- 2009, the Conference Board Review described Chowdhury as "an excitable, enthusiastic evangelist for quality." In an article speculating about an up-and-coming book by Jack Welch, The New York Times described Chowdhury as a "leading Quality Expert". Marshall Goldsmith called Chowdhury "the Quality Prophet" in an interview published by Business Week in 2007.
- 2011, 2013, 2015, and 2017, 2019, 2021 Chowdhury was selected as one of the "top 50 management thinkers in the world" by Thinkers50, an organization created by Des Dearlove and Stuart Crainer.
- 2013, Thinkers 50 recognized Chowdhury with a nomination for the 2013 "Breakthrough Idea" award for his work on "Economics of Quality".
- 2019 and 2021 Thinkers 50 shortlisted Chowdhury as a recipient of the "Ideas into Practice" award for his work with business and communities.

=== Educational institutions recognition ===
- Doctor of Law (Honoris Causa), University of Western Ontario, Canada, June 2022. He also delivered the commencement address for the 2022 Western University graduating class.
- Doctor of Commercial Science (Honoris Causa), Central Michigan University (CMU), USA, May 2019. He also delivered the commencement address for the 2019 CMU graduating class.
- Doctor of Engineering (Honoris Causa), Michigan Technological University, USA, May 2004.
- Distinguished Alumnus Award, Indian Institute of Technology (IIT), Kharagpur, India, 2009.
- Distinguished Alumnus Award, Central Michigan University (CMU), Michigan, USA, 2003.

=== Professional society honors ===
Chowdhury is recognized as a “Fellow” in the following organizations:

- Society of Automotive Engineers (SAE),
- Society of Manufacturing Engineers (SME),
- American Society for Quality (ASQ),
- Royal Statistical Society - United Kingdom,
- Engineering Society of Detroit (ESD).

Chowdhury is recognized as a "Life Fellow" of the Royal Asiatic Society, UK.

In 2011, the Society of Automotive Engineers (SAE) established the “Subir Chowdhury Medal of Quality Leadership” to be given each year to a global leader who promotes Quality in mobility industry.

In addition he has been awarded Honorary Membership in the following organizations:

- American Society for Mechanical Engineers
- Institute of Industrial and Systems Engineers
