= Business administration =

Administration of a commercial enterprise

Business administration, also known as business management, is the administration of a commercial enterprise. It includes all aspects of overseeing and supervising the business operations of an organization.

== Overview ==
The administration of a business includes the performance or management of business operations and decision-making, as well as the efficient organization of people and other resources to direct activities towards common goals. In general, "administration" refers to the broader management function, including the associated finance, personnel and MIS services.

Administration can refer to the bureaucratic or operational performance of routine office tasks, usually internally oriented and reactive rather than proactive. Administrators, broadly speaking, perform a common set of functions to achieve an organization's goals. Henri Fayol (1841–1925) described these "functions" of the administrator as "the five elements of administration". According to Fayol, the five functions of management are planning, organizing, commanding, coordinating, and controlling. Without proper business management, a firm cannot utilize its resources effectively, making management the most important factor in running a business.

=== Key skills for business management ===
Strategic thinking, leadership, problem-solving, communication, and the ability to work effectively with a diverse range of people and organizations are among the key skills and competencies required of effective managers. Managers must also be able to balance the needs and interests of various stakeholders, such as employees, customers, shareholders, and the larger community. Management is a critical aspect of any successful organization, requiring a wide range of skills, knowledge, and expertise. Whether managing a small team or a large corporation, effective management is essential for achieving success and driving growth. Another critical aspect of management is effectively managing and motivating employees. Managers must foster a positive and productive work environment while recognizing and rewarding employees who contribute to the organization's overall success. This can include providing opportunities for professional development and growth, establishing clear communication channels, and ensuring that everyone understands their roles and responsibilities.

=== Concepts in business management ===
- Corporate culture
- Fail fast
- Kanban
- Sunk cost

== Academic degrees ==
=== Bachelor of Business Administration ===
The Bachelor of Business Administration (BBA, B.B.A., BSBA, B.S.B.A., BS, B.S., or B.Sc.), Bachelor of Science in Business, Business Administration, Business Management (BS), or Bachelor of Commerce (Bcom. or BComm) is a bachelor's degree in commerce and business administration. The duration of the degree is four years in the United States and three years in Europe (except in Spain and some other countries where a bachelor takes 4 years). The degree is designed to provide a broad understanding of the functional aspects of a company and its interconnections, while also allowing specialization in a particular area. The degree also develops the student's practical, managerial, and communication skills, as well as business decision-making capabilities, to succeed in the competitive world. Many programs incorporate training and practical experience, in the form of case projects, presentations, internships, industrial visits, and interaction with experts from industry.

=== Master of Business Administration ===
The Master of Business Administration (MBA or M.B.A.) is a master's degree in business administration with a significant focus on management. The MBA degree originated in the United States in the early-20th century, when the nation industrialized and companies sought scientific approaches to management. The core courses in an MBA program cover various areas of business, such as accounting, finance, marketing, human resources, and operations, in a manner most relevant to management analysis and strategy. Most programs also include elective courses.

=== Master of Management ===
The Master of Management (MiM) or Master of Science in Management (MSM) is a postgraduate degree with a focus in business management.

In terms of content, it is similar to the Master of Business Administration (MBA) degree as it contains identical management courses but is open to prospective postgraduate candidates at any level in their career, unlike MBA programs that have longer course credit requirements and only accept mid-career professionals.

=== Doctor of Business Administration ===
The Doctor of Business Administration (DBA or DrBA) is a research doctorate awarded based on advanced study and research in the field of business administration. The DBA is a terminal degree in business administration and is equivalent to the Ph.D. in Business Administration.

=== PhD in Management ===
The PhD in Management is the highest academic degree awarded in the study of business management. The degree is intended for those seeking academic research- and teaching-careers as faculty or professors in the study of management at business schools worldwide.

=== Doctor of Management ===
A newer form of a management doctorate is the Doctor of Management (D.M., D.Mgt., DBA, or DMan). It is a doctoral degree conferred upon an individual who is trained through advanced study and research in the applied science and professional practice of management. This doctorate incorporates elements of both research and practice related to social and managerial concerns within society and organizations.

== See also ==
- Bachelor of Business Information Systems
- Outline of business administration
- Business economics
- Business informatics
- Business studies
- List of business journals
