= Whiting Williams =

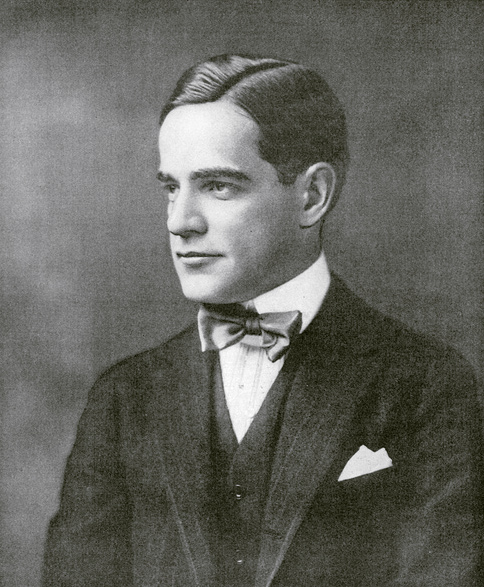
1920 portrait of Whiting Williams from Popular Science magazine

Whiting Williams (March 11, 1878 – April 14, 1975) was co-founder of the Welfare Federation of Cleveland, a predecessor to the Community Chest and United Way charitable organizations, as well as an author of popular books and articles about labor relations during the early 20th century. He was one of a number of social investigators who gathered information by going "undercover" to live as a worker.

== Biography ==
=== Overview ===
Whiting Williams was born Charles Whiting Williams on March 11,1878 in Shelby, Ohio to Benjamin J. Williams and Ida Whiting. He is best known as the management consultant who went undercover to study various working conditions in the early twentieth century. He disguised himself as a laborer in coal mines, railroad shops, shipyards, and oil refineries in the United States, Europe, and Central and South America. At the commencement of his research in 1920, he wrote a book, What's on the Workers Mind, Put On Coveralls To Find Out, followed by several other writings which documented the findings of his research.

=== Education ===
In 1899, Whiting Williams graduated from Oberlin College after which he continued his education at the University of Berlin for a year (1899–1900), and then the University of Chicago (1900–1901). Thereafter, he managed the Bureau of University Travel (1901–1904) and became the Assistant to the President at Oberlin College (1904–1912). In the meantime, he earned a master's degree in 1909.

=== Early career (1904–1918) ===
Williams career started when he took a position as manager of the University Travel Bureau. He held this job until 1904, when he wrote a letter to the President of Oberlin College, Henry C. King, during his trip to Europe. In this, he suggested that a college president needed a full-time assistant to look after the less academic problems facing a school. In November of that same year Williams received a reply to his letter in which he was appointed assistant to the President. He held this position until 1912, and within this time period he met and married his first wife, Caroline Harter.

In 1912, Williams moved to Cleveland, Ohio to co-found the Cleveland Federation for Charity and Philanthropy. This organization was based on the premise that the competition of charitable organizations with each other for contributions was detrimental to their best interests. In response to this, the Cleveland Federation proposed that a single organization conduct a single massive fund drive and disburse the contributions among the various charitable groups in the city. The Federation was groundbreaking in this attempt, and provided the foundation for what are known as Community Chest, United Fund, and United Way. In 1917, the organization's name changed to the Welfare Federation of Cleveland and Williams' title became executive secretary within the Federation. He pioneered more than 2,400 United Appeals.

With a growing family, in 1916 Williams began selling group life insurance as a special representative for the Equitable Life Assurance Society with the belief that this would be the wave of the future and that this would be a service to workers that could not afford individual insurance policies. Amidst the transitions he underwent in terms of his career, Williams grew concerned that his name was too popular, fearing that people might not be able to distinguish him among so many others. Therefore, in June 1917 he had his name legally changed from Charles Williams to Whiting Williams.

In 1918, Williams moved to industrial world, to become Vice President and Personnel Director of Cleveland Hydraulic Pressed Steel Co.

=== Later career (1918–1960) ===
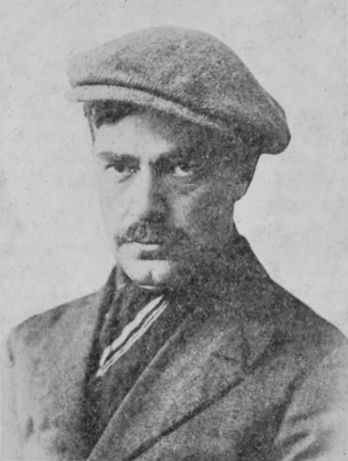
As a laborer in England

Williams took a leave of absence in 1920 to study working conditions and workers' attitudes firsthand, first in the United States, and later in various countries. Speaking multiple languages, French, German, Spanish, and Italian, enabled Williams to work as laborer in coal mines, railroad shops, shipyards, and oil refineries in the U.S., Europe, and Central and South America. Based on his research, he gave lectures and wrote several books, such as What's on the Worker's Mind (1920), Full Up and Fed Up (1921), Horny Hands and Hampered Elbows (1922), and Mainsprings of Men (1925).

Based on his work as a common laborer in the steel mills and in a rolling mill, as a coal miner in two towns, as a shipbuilder, as an oil man in a refinery, and as a worker in the iron mines, Williams wrote a 1920 book entitled What's on the Worker's Mind, subtitled By One Who Put On Overalls To Find Out. Much of these experiences are presented in a journal-like format throughout the book. In the preface, Williams argues that "the daily job as the axle of the entire world". The book is divided into two parts; part 1 "Overalls" and part 2 "Findings." In part 1, these topics are explored within the following chapters: "Hunting a Job", "In a Ten-Thousand-Man-Power Steel Plant", "In a Rolling-Mill", "Steel Slow-Miner's Wanted", "A Second Coal Town", "The Circle of the Hiring Gates", "With the Builders of Ships", "In an Oil Refinery", "In The Iron Mines", and "Among the Ignonts and Billets Again". The latter portion, "Findings," includes "Some Outstanding Impressions", "Some Deeper Factors", "The Way Out-and Management", and "The Way Out and The Public." While conducting his research, Williams adopted the idea that "no half measures in the manner of disguise." Moreover, he presented himself with "a different name, a slim pocketbook, rough clothes, an unshaven face and a grammerless lingo". He claimed that his research "cheated no employer" as he worked tirelessly in order to derive the ruptured relations between "Labor, Management, and the Public -- the investors in brawn, brains, and bullion, and the bourgeoisie". Williams refrained from including any explicit details about companies within his book, including their geographic locations "because neither commendation nor criticism of communities or companies is intended or desired". Surprisingly, Williams did not offer conclusions or prescriptions but pointed out the most prominent concern among workers: terrible foremen.

Williams transformed his approach in 1931 from working for a single company or client to sending reports on labor conditions to a number of industrialists as a mass news service. These reports often considered the way in which management could placate industrial unrest and avoid other struggles within the workplace. Williams argued for an increased emphasis on individualism and consistently and vigorously opposed the New Deal and the Congress of Industrial Organizations (CIO) in the following years. At the same time, he gained national fame as a respected lecturer. The groups he addressed varied in size from the local Rotary clubs to business conferences and graduate business schools.

Williams was a consultant on labor relations, personnel management, and public relations for several large businesses and spent the duration of his career lecturing about his experiences for several graduate schools including Harvard, Dartmouth, and Case Western Reserve University, until he retired at age 90. In 1940, he became a member of the National Panel of Arbitrators. In addition, he was a member of the Cosmos Club in Washington, D.C. as well as the Union Club of Cleveland. Meanwhile in Cleveland, he was a trustee of both Hiram House and the School of Art.

All the while, Williams continued writing articles. Williams also continued working into the 1960s, the ninth decade of his life.

He was the subject of a biography by Daniel Wren in 1987. His collected papers are in the Western Reserve Historical Society.

=== Personal life ===
Williams married Caroline Harter in 1906. They had two children, Carol R. and Harter Whiting. Williams faced two major tragedies in his personal life. In 1932 his daughter Carol, who was a talented musician, was killed in a mysterious explosion in Cleveland Heights. Soon thereafter, in 1938 his wife, Caroline, died. Williams found strength in his son, Harter, and married Dorothy Rogers in September 1941.

Williams died in Cleveland on April 14, 1975, and was buried in Shelby, Ohio.

== Publications ==
- What's on the Worker's Mind (1920)
- Full Up and Fed Up: The Worker's Mind in Crowded Britain (1921)
- File:Horny Hands and Hampered Elbows: The Worker's Mind in Western Europe (1922)
