= Henri Fayol =

French mining engineer and executive, developer of "Fayolism"

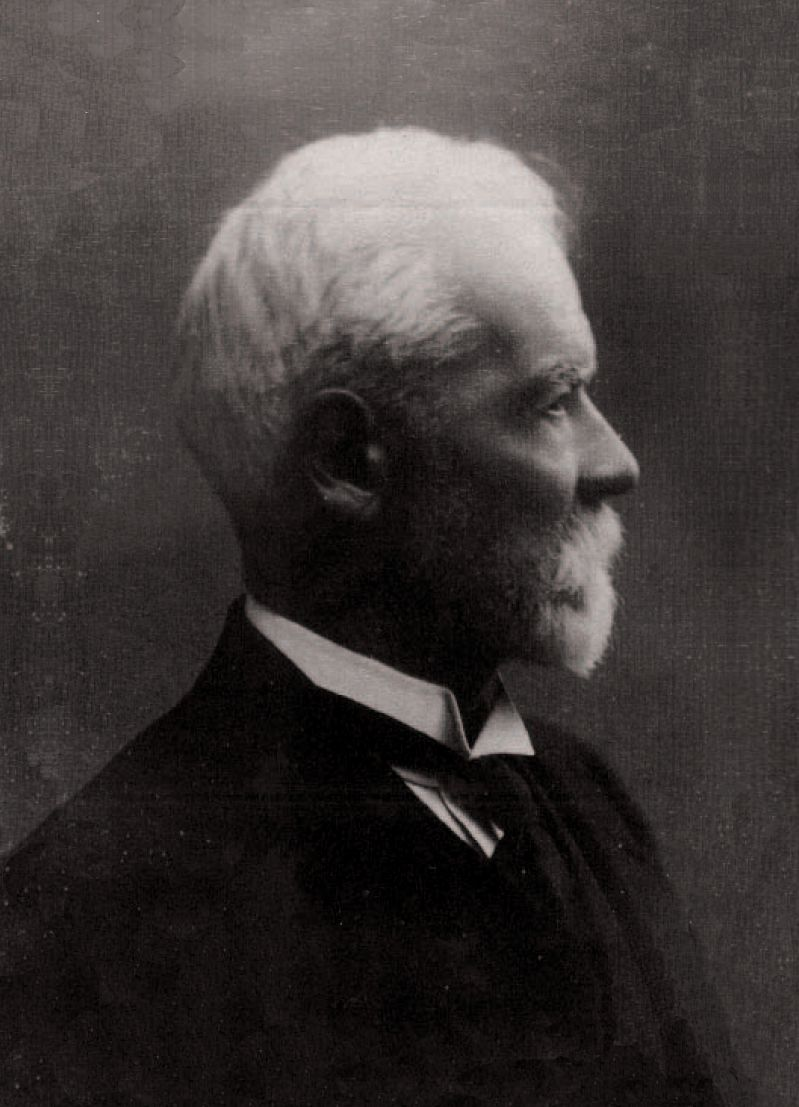
- Fayol at the age of 70
- Born: Jules Henri Fayol; 29 July 1841; Istanbul, Ottoman Empire
- Died: 19 November 1925 (aged 84); Paris, France
- Occupations: Economist, Engineer, Entrepreneur

Academic background
- Education: École des Mines de Saint-Étienne
- Influences: Frederick Winslow Taylor; Henry Louis Le Chatelier

Academic work
- School or tradition: Fayolism
- Notable ideas: Fayolism

Henri Fayol (29 July 1841 – 19 November 1925) was a French mining engineer, mining executive, author and director of mines who developed a general theory of business administration that is often called Fayolism. He and his colleagues developed this theory independently of scientific management. Like his contemporary Frederick Winslow Taylor, he is widely acknowledged as a founder of modern management methods.

== Biography ==
Henri Fayol was born in 1841 amidst the great eruption of the industrial revolution in a suburb of Constantinople (now Istanbul). His father, a military engineer, was appointed superintendent of works to build Galata Bridge, across the Golden Horn. The family returned to France in 1847, where Fayol graduated from the mining academy "École Nationale Supérieure des Mines" in Saint-Étienne in 1860.

That same year, aged 19, Fayol started working at the mining company named "Compagnie de Commentry-Fourchambault-Decazeville" in Commentry, in the Auvergne region. He was hired by Stéphane Mony, who had decided to hire the best engineers from the Saint-Étienne Mining School, and Fayol joined the firm as an engineer and trainee manager. Mony made Fayol his protégé, and Fayol succeeded him as manager of the Commentry mine when he was 25. Eventually he was made managing director of Commentry-Fourchambault and Decazeville.

During his time at the mine, he studied the causes of underground fires, how to prevent them, how to fight them, how to reclaim mining areas that had been burned, and developed a knowledge of the structure of the basin. In 1888 he was promoted to managing director. During his time as director, he made changes to improve the working situations in the mines, such as allowing employees to work in teams, and changing the division of labor. Later, more mines were added to his duties.

In 1900 Fayol became a member of the Comité Central des Houillères de France, member of the board of the Comité des forges and administrator of the Société de Commentry, Fourchambault et Decazeville. Eventually, the board decided to abandon its iron and steel business and the coal mines. They chose Henri Fayol to oversee this as the new managing director. Upon receiving the position, Fayol presented the board with a plan to restore the firm. The board accepted the proposal. At that time, the company was at the verge of bankruptcy. With rich and broad administrative experience, Fayol contributed a lot in turning around the company's fortunes. When he retired in 1918, the company was financially strong and one of the largest industrial combines in Europe.

Based largely on his own management experience, he developed his concept of administration. In 1916 he promoted his ideas in Administration Industrielle et Générale, at about the same time as Frederick Winslow Taylor published his Principles of Scientific Management. After his retirement he became the Director of the Centre of Administrative Studies in Paris.

== Work ==
Fayol's work became more generally known with the 1949 publication of "General and industrial administration", the English translation of the 1916 work "Administration industrielle et générale". In this work Fayol presented his theory of management, known as Fayolism. Before that Fayol had written several articles on mining engineering, starting in the 1870s, and some preliminary papers on administration.

=== Mining engineering ===
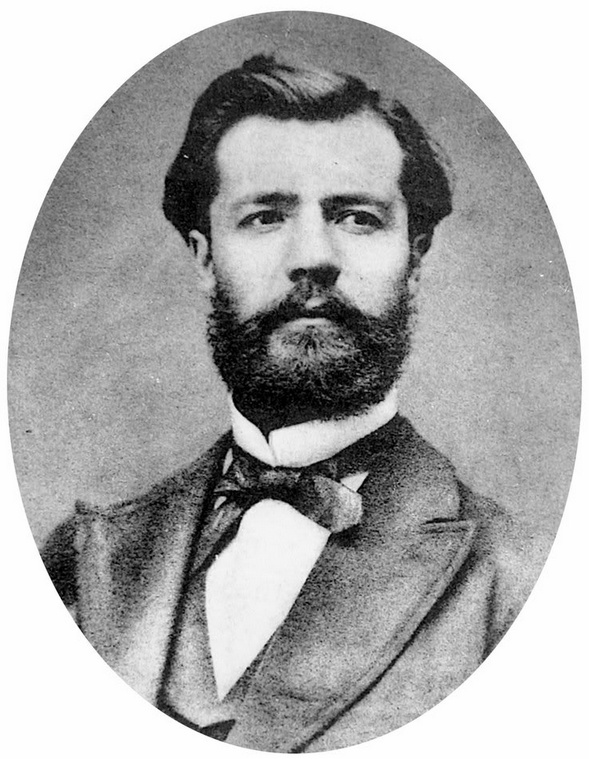
Henri Fayol, ca. 1870-80 (age 30–40)

Starting in the 1870s, Fayol wrote a series of articles on mining subjects, such as on the spontaneous heating of coal (1879), the formation of coal beds (1887), the sedimentation of the Commentry, and on plant fossils (1890).

His first articles were published in the French Bulletin de la Société de l'Industrie minérale, and beginning in the early 1880s in the Comptes rendus de l'Académie des sciences, the proceedings of the French Academy of Sciences.

=== Fayolism ===
Fayol's work was one of the first comprehensive statements of a general theory of management. He proposed that there were six types of organisational activity, including management as one of these, five primary functions of management and fourteen principles of management.

==== Types of organisational activity ====
Fayol divided the range of activities undertaken within an industrial undertaking into six types:-

- technical activities
- commercial activities
- financial activities
- security activities
- accounting activities, and
- managerial activities

==== Functions of management ====
In his original work, Administration industrielle et générale; prévoyance, organisation, commandement, coordination, controle, five primary functions were identified:

1. Planning
2. Organizing
3. Commanding
4. Co-ordinating
5. Controlling

The control function, from the French contrôler, is used in the sense that a manager must receive feedback about a process in order to make necessary adjustments and must analyze the deviations. Lately scholars of management combined the directing and coordinating function into one leading function.

==== Principles of management ====
1. Division of work - In practice, employees are specialized in different areas and they have different skills. Different levels of expertise can be distinguished within the knowledge areas (from generalist to specialist). Personal and professional developments support this. According to Henri Fayol specialization promotes efficiency of the workforce and increases productivity. In addition, the specialization of the workforce increases their accuracy and speed. This management principle of the 14 principles of management is applicable to both technical and managerial activities.
2. Authority and Responsibility - According to Henri Fayol, the accompanying power or authority gives the management the right to give orders to the subordinates.
3. Discipline - This principle is about obedience. It is often a part of the core values of a mission and vision in the form of good conduct and respectful interactions.
4. Unity of command - Every employee should receive orders from only one superior or on behalf of the superior.
5. Unity of direction - Each group of organisational activities that have the same objective should be directed by one manager using one plan for achievement of one common goal.
6. Subordination of Individual Interest to General Interest - The interests of any one employee or group of employees should not take precedence over the interests of the organisation as a whole.
7. Remuneration - All Workers must be paid a fair wage for their services. The wages paid must be as per a certain standard of living to the employee at the same time it is within the paying capacity of the company.
8. Centralization and Decentralization - This refers to the degree to which subordinates are involved in decision making.
9. Scalar chain - The line of authority from top management to the lowest ranks represents the scalar chain. Communications should follow this chain. However, if someone needs to communicate some other person in emergency he/she might use "Gang Plank". ≤Fayol suggested the concept of ‘Gang Plank’ to avoid delays and allow direct communication between two subordinates at the same level.≥
10. Order - this principle is concerned with systematic arrangement of men, machine, material etc. There should be a specific place for every employee in an organization. That is 'a place for everything (people) and everything has a place'.
11. Equity - All the employees in the organization must be treated equally with respect to the justice and kindliness.
12. Stability of tenure of personnel - High employee turnover is inefficient. Management should provide orderly personnel planning and ensure that replacements are available to fill vacancies.
13. Initiative - Employees who are allowed to originate and carry out plans will exert high levels of effort.
14. Esprit de Corps - Promoting team spirit will build harmony and unity within the organization.

Some Fayolian principles still influence some contemporary management theories to a certain degree.

== Publications ==
=== Books, translated ===
- In 1930, Industrial and General Administration. Translated by J.A. Coubrough, London: Sir Isaac Pitman & Sons.
- Fayol, Henri (1949). General and Industrial Management. London: Sir Isaac Pitman & Sons.

=== Articles, translated, a selection ===
- 1900. "Henri Fayol addressed his colleagues in the mineral industry 23 June 1900." Translated by J.A. Coubrough. In: Fayol (1930) Industrial and General Administration. pp. 79–81 (Republished in: Wren, Bedeian & Breeze, (2002) "The foundations of Henri Fayol's administrative theory ")
- 1909. "L'exposee des principles generaux d'administration". Translated by J.D Breeze. published in: Daniel A. Wren, Arthur G. Bedeian, John D. Breeze, (2002) "The foundations of Henri Fayol's administrative theory ", Management Decision, Vol. 40 Iss: 9, pp. 906 – 918
- 1923. "The administrative theory in the state". Translated by S. Greer. In: Gulick, L. and Urwick. L. Eds. (1937) Papers on the Science of Administration, Institute of Public Administration. New York. pp. 99–114
