= Daniel A. Wren =

American business theorist (born 1932)

- Born: January 8, 1932 (age 94); Columbia, Missouri, U.S.
- Occupations: Business theorist; professor

Academic background
- Education: University of Missouri (BSc, MSc); University of Illinois (PhD)

Daniel A. (Dan) Wren (born January 8, 1932) is an American business theorist and Emeritus Professor at the University of Oklahoma, especially known for his 1972 book coauthored with Arthur G. Bedeian, entitled "The evolution of management thought."

== Early life and education ==
Wren was born in Columbia, Missouri, and raised in a village south of Columbia, Missouri in the country on highway 63, where his father owned and run a General store. He received his BSc in Industrial and Personnel Management in 1954 at the University of Missouri, and then went through the ROTC program of the US Air force and was stationed in Germany. Back at the University of Missouri he received his MSc in Management. After working for Hallmark Cards in Kansas City, Missouri, he joined the PhD program at the University of Illinois, where in 1964 he obtained his PhD in business.

== Career ==
Wren had started his academic career at the Florida State University as Assistant Professor in 1963 and made it Associate Professor and eventually Full Professor. In 1972 he wrote his work on "The evolution of management thought". In 1973 he moved to the University of Oklahoma, where in 1989 he was appointed David Ross Boyd Professor of Management and between 1994 and 1999 also McCasland Foundation Professor of American Free Enterprise. Since 2000 he has been David Ross Boyd Professor Emeritus. In 1973 Wren was also appointed Curator of the Harry W. Bass Business History Collection, from 1975 to 1977 he was Director of the Division of Management, and in 2005/06 he was Interim Dean and Fred E. Brown Chair of the Price College of Business.

Wren was president of the Southern Management Association for the year 1973–74, where he initiated their awards for member contributions. In the Academy of Management he chaired their Management History Division. He was elected fellow of both professional associations.

Wren was awarded the Outstanding Educator of America Awards twice, and received the Academy of Management's Distinguished Educator of the Year-awarded, in recognition of being "the most outstanding management historian of his generation."

== Work ==
=== Most Influential Management Books of the 20th century, 2001 ===
At the turn of the century several authors started reflection on 20th century management. Studies were made by Arthur G. Bedeian and Wren (2001), looking back at books on management, and by Stuart Crainer and Des Dearlove (2002) looking back at the most influential management thinkers of the 20th century. In the 2001 article in Organizational Dynamics Bedeian and Wren gave a listing of the twenty-five most influential management books. The authors were selected publications based on the impact they had in their time on management thinking, and on the impact they had in the management discipline as a whole. Together with a panel of consultants a first listing was developed, which was further compiled based on a poll of the fellow members of the Academy of Management.

The first ten books in their final listing:

- Frederick Winslow Taylor (1911), The Principles of Scientific Management.
- Chester I. Barnard (1938), The Functions of the Executive.
- Peter F. Drucker (1954), The practice of Management.
- Douglas McGregor (1960), The Human Side of Enterprise.
- Herbert A. Simon (1947), Administrative Behavior: A Study of Decision-making Processes in Administrative Organization. With a Foreword by Chester I. Barnard
- Paul R. Lawrence and Jay W. Lorsch (1967), Organization and environment: Managing differentiation and integration.
- James G. March and Herbert A. Simon (1958), Organizations.
- Abraham H. Maslow (1954), Motivation and Personality.
- Michael E. Porter (1980), Competitive strategy: Techniques for analyzing industries and competitors.
- Fritz J. Roethlisberger and William J. Dickson (1939), Management and the Worker.

About their first choice: They further explained that, "Although Taylor remains the favorite bogeyman of the popular press, the fundamental principle of Taylor's philosophy - the rule of knowledge as opposed to tradition and personal opinion - is as valid today as it was in its time."

== Selected publications ==
Wren authored, co-authored and/or edited nine books and over 40 journal articles. A selection:

- Wren, Daniel A.. The evolution of management thought, 1972; 8th edition (2020) coauthored with Arthur G. Bedeian.
- Daniel A. Wren, Dan Voich. Principles of management: process and behavior, 1976.

Articles, a selection:

- Wren, Daniel A. "Interface and interorganizational coordination." Academy of Management Journal 10.1 (1967): 69-81.
- Wren, Daniel A. "Management history: issues and ideas for teaching and research." Journal of Management 13.2 (1987): 339-350.
- Wren, Daniel A., Arthur G. Bedeian, and John D. Breeze. "The foundations of Henri Fayol's administrative theory." Management Decision 40.9 (2001): 906-918.
- Bedeian, Arthur G., and Daniel A. Wren. "Most influential management books of the 20th Century." Organizational Dynamics 29.3 (2002): 221-225.
