= Peter Compston =

Royal Navy admiral (1915–2000)

Vice-Admiral Sir Peter Compston KCB
- Born: 12 September 1915
- Died: 20 August 2000 (aged 84)
- Military career
- Allegiance: United Kingdom
- Branch: Royal Navy
- Service years: 1937–1970
- Rank: Vice-Admiral
- Commands: HMS Orwell; HMS Victorious
- Conflicts: World War II; Indonesia–Malaysia confrontation
- Awards: Knight Commander of the Order of the Bath

Vice-Admiral Sir Peter Maxwell Compston KCB (12 September 1915 – 20 August 2000) was a Royal Navy officer who became Deputy Supreme Allied Commander Atlantic.

== Naval career ==
Educated at the Epsom College, Compston joined the Royal Air Force in 1936 and transferred to the Royal Navy in 1937. He served in World War II with 810 Naval Air Squadron and then 700 Naval Air Squadron. He was appointed Commanding Officer of the frigate HMS Orwell in 1955, naval attaché in Paris in 1960 and Commanding Officer of the aircraft carrier HMS Victorious in 1962. Victorious was under Compston's command during service in the Indonesia–Malaysia confrontation. He was promoted to rear admiral on 7 January 1965, went on to be naval attaché in Washington D. C. in 1965, Flag Officer Flotillas Western Fleet in 1967 and Deputy Supreme Allied Commander Atlantic in 1968. He retired in 1970.

== Family ==
In 1939 he married Valerie Marjorie Bocquet; they had one son and one daughter. Following the dissolution of his first marriage, he married Angela Brickwood in 1954.

Military offices
| Preceded by Sir David Clutterbuck | Deputy Supreme Allied Commander Atlantic; 1968–1970 | Succeeded by Sir John Martin |
