= Arthur G. Bedeian =

American business theorist (born 1946)

- Born: December 22, 1946 (age 78); Davenport, Iowa, U.S.
- Occupations: Business theorist; professor
- Years active: 1973–2015

Academic background
- Education: University of Iowa (BBA); University of Memphis (MBA); Mississippi State University (DBA)
- Doctoral advisor: Giovanni B. Giglioni

Arthur G. Bedeian (born December 22, 1946) is an American business theorist and Emeritus Professor of Management at Louisiana State University, known from his book coauthored with Daniel A. Wren, titled "The evolution of management thought."

== Early life and education ==
Born in Davenport, Iowa, Bedeian received his Bachelor of Business Administration in 1967 from the University of Iowa, his MBA in 1968 from the University of Memphis, and his Doctor of Business Administration in 1973 from the Mississippi State University with the thesis, entitled "A standardization of selected management concepts," under the supervision of Giovanni B. Giglioni.

== Career ==
After graduation Bedeian started his academic career as Assistant Professor at the School of Business at Auburn University. In 1985 he joined management faculty at Louisiana State University (LSU). In 1996 he was appointed Boyd Professor of Management, a chair established in 1953 in honor of David and Thomas Boyd. Among other outside activities, he served as president of the Southern Management Association during 1982-1983, and as the 44th President of the Academy of Management in 1989.

At Louisiana State University Bedeian was awarded the LSU Alumni Association Distinguished Faculty Award in 1992, the LSU Distinguished Research Master Award in 1996, the LSU Foundation Distinguished Faculty Teaching Award in 1999, and the LSU Distinguished Faculty Award in 2006. The Academy of Management awarded him the Distinguished Service Award, the Ronald G. Greenwood Lifetime Achievement Award, and the Richard M. Hodgetts Distinguished Career Award. He was also elected a Fellow of the American Psychological Association, a Fellow of the Society for Industrial and Organizational Psychology, and a Fellow of the Association for Psychological Science, Fellow and the Southern Management Association. He has received many other awards, as well.

He retired in 2015 but remains an Emeritus Professor.

== Selected publications ==
Bedeian has authored and coauthored more than twelve books and over 300 articles and essays as an expert in the evolution of management thinking. He has also produced five films, some of which have been translated into French, Spanish, Russian, Chinese, Arabic, Persian, and Thai.

=== Books ===
- Bedeian, Arthur G. Organizations: Theory and Analysis. 1983. ISBN 978-0-030-62617-3
- Buford, James A., Arthur G. Bedeian, and James R. Lindner. Management in Extension. 1995. 3rd ed. ISBN 978-0-964-85470-3
- Wren, Daniel A., and Arthur G. Bedeian. The Evolution of Management Thought, 2017. 7th ed. ISBN 978-1-119-44142-7

=== Articles ===
- Bedeian, Arthur G., and Achilles A. Armenakis. "A path-analytic study of the consequences of role conflict and ambiguity." Academy of Management Journal Vol. 24, No. 2 (1981): 417-424.
- Greenhaus, Jeffrey H., Arthur G. Bedeian, and Kevin W. Mossholder. "Work experiences, job performance, and feelings of personal and family well-being." Journal of Vocational Behavior Vol. 31, No. 2 (1987): 200-215.
- Bedeian, Arthur G., Beverly G. Burke, and Richard G. Moffett. "Outcomes of work-family conflict among married male and female professionals." Journal of Management Vol. 14, No. 3 (1988): 475-491.
- Carson, Kerry D., and Arthur G. Bedeian. "Career commitment: Construction of a measure and examination of its psychometric properties." Journal of Vocational Behavior Vol. 44, No. 3 (1994): 237-262.
- Armenakis, Achilles A., and Arthur G. Bedeian. "Organizational change: A review of theory and research in the 1990s." Journal of Management Vol. 25, No.3 (1999): 293-315.
