= Giovanni B. Giglioni =

American business theorist (1929–2008)

- Born: Giovanni Battista Giglioni; January 18, 1929; Perugia, Italy
- Died: January 23, 2008 (aged 79); Greenville, North Carolina, U.S.
- Citizenship: Italy (until 1955); United States (from 1955)
- Years active: 1960–1992
- Spouse: Joyce Bateman

Academic background
- Education: Tulane University (BBA, MBA); Indiana University (PhD)
- Doctoral advisor: Charles F. Bosner

Academic work
- Doctoral students: Arthur G. Bedeian

Giovanni Battista Giglioni (January 18, 1929 – January 23, 2008) was an American business theorist, and professor of management and international business at Mississippi State University. He is notable for his 1974 article, "A Conspectus of Management Control Theory: 1900-1972", co-authored with Arthur G. Bedeian.

== Early life and education ==
John Giovanni Battista Giglioni was born on January 18, 1929 in Perugia, Italy, to Quindicio and Elvira Ciconi Giglioni. He immigrated to the United States in 1955, where he became a nationalized citizen.

He received a BBA in 1958, and an MBA in 1959 at Tulane University. In 1960, Giglioni was appointed instructor in management at Tulane University. In 1969, he received a PhD from Indiana University, under the supervision of Charles F. Bosner, with the thesis entitled, "Multiple Correlation Analysis for Manpower Forecasting: A Case Study."

== Career ==
After graduation, Giglioni moved to Mississippi State University, where he became Associate Professor of Management and Director of the Manpower Research Center. In the 1970s, he was appointed Professor of Management. Arthur G. Bedeian was his Ph.D. student.

He retired in 1992.

== Personal life ==
He married Joyce Bateman Giglioni.

== Death ==
He died on January 23, 2008 in Pitt Memorial Hospital in Greenville, North Carolina.

== Selected publications ==
- Giglioni, Giovanni Battista. Multiple Correlation Analysis for Manpower Forecasting: A Case Study. Diss. Indiana University, 1968.
- Giovanni B. Giglioni, Manpower planning for selected manufacturing industries in Mississippi. Division of Business Research, College of Business and Industry, Mississippi State University. 1970

Articles, a selection

- Giglioni, Giovanni B., and Arthur G. Bedeian. "A conspectus of management control theory: 1900-1972." Academy of Management Journal 17.2 (1974): 292-305.
- Giovanni B. Giglioni, Joyce B. Giglioni, and James A. Bryant, "Performance Appraisal: Here Comes the Judge," California Management Review 26 (Winter 1981), pp. 14–23
