= Community Chest (organization) =

Organization

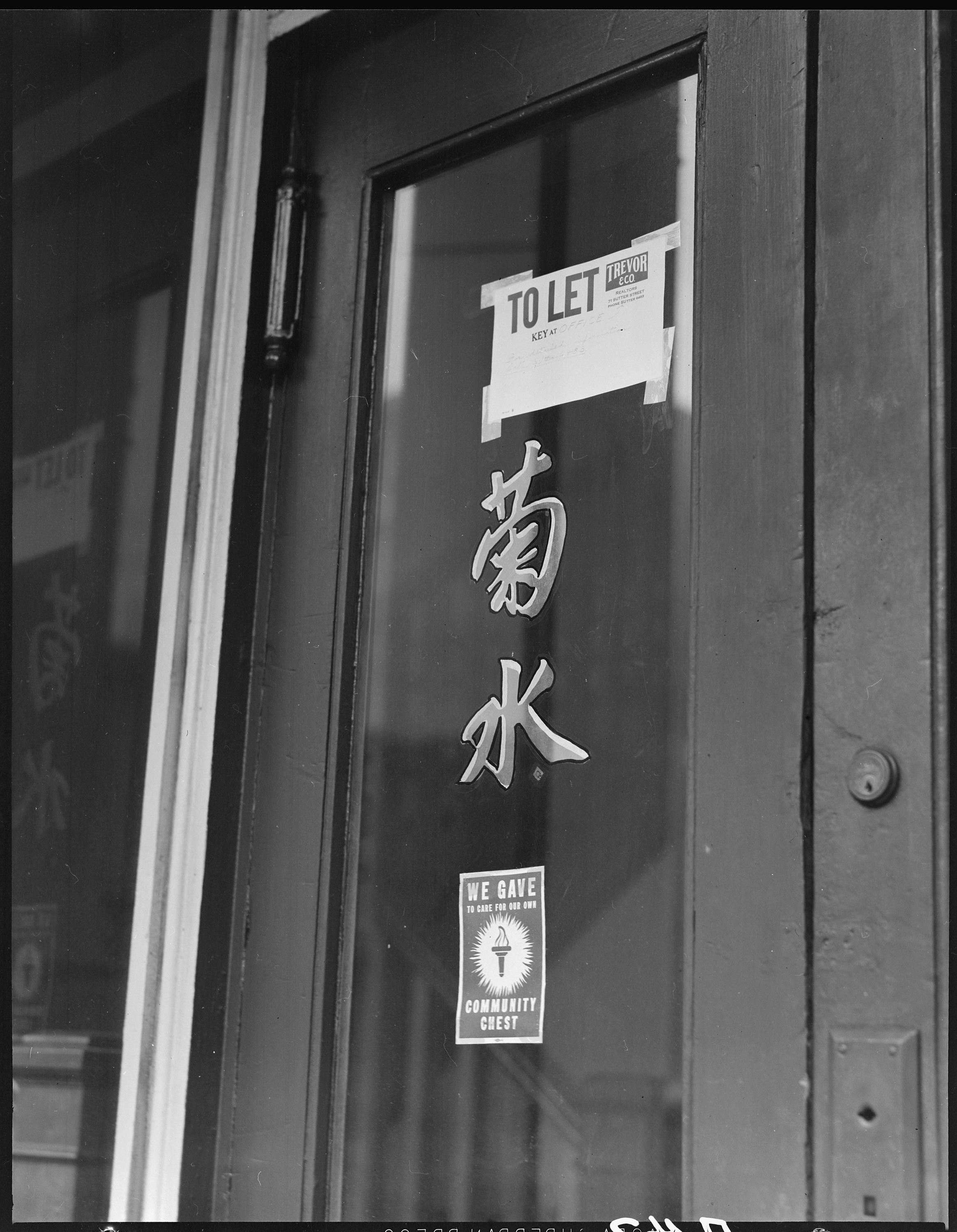
Small Community Chest sticker, on the door of a vacated restaurant owned by interned Japanese Americans, San Francisco, California, 1942

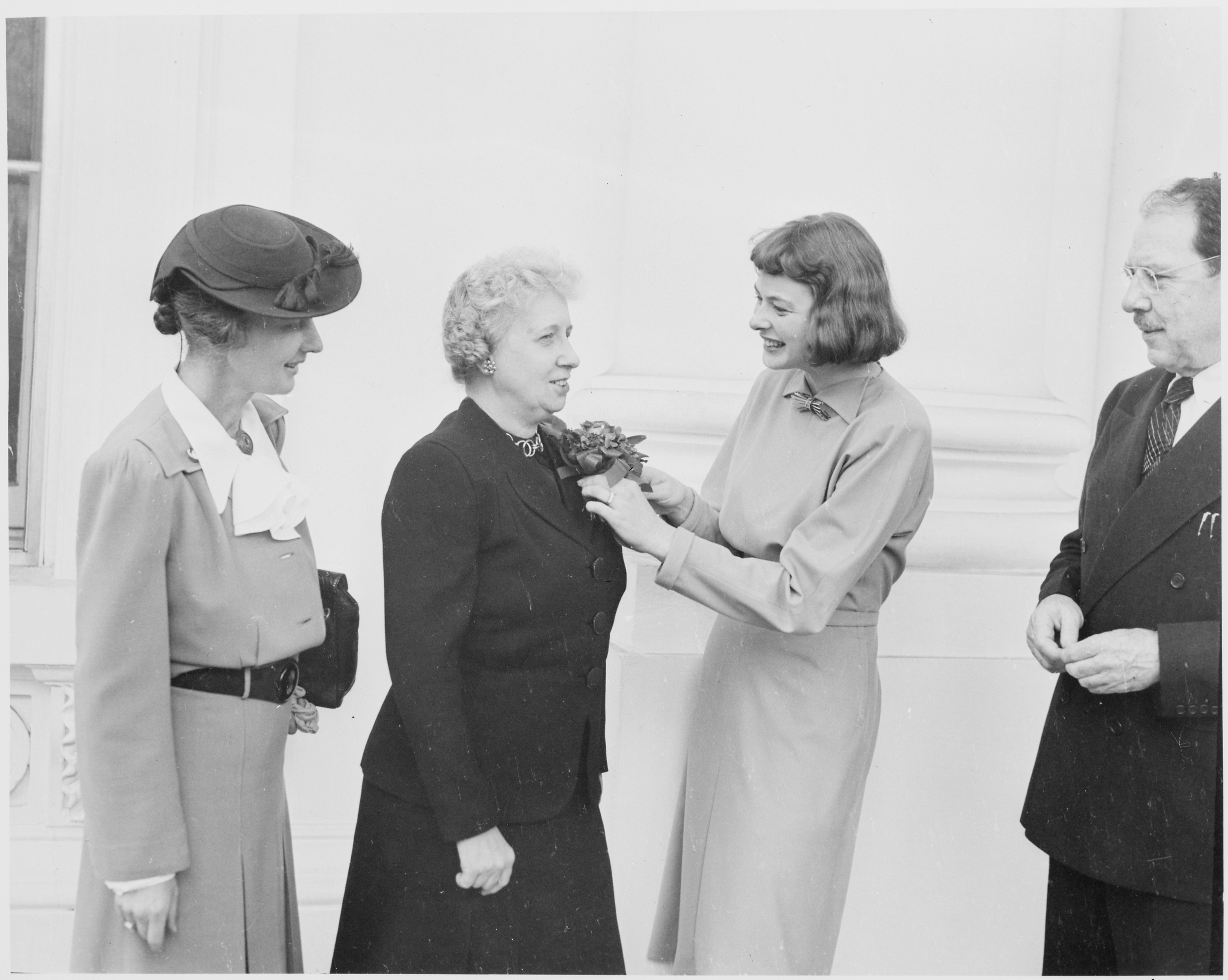
Bess Truman receiving a Community Chest award from Ingrid Bergman (1946)

Community Chests, commonly referred to as community trusts, community foundations and united way organizations, are endowment funds in the U.S. and Canada, pooled from a community for the purpose of charitable giving. The first Community Chest, "Community Fund", was founded in 1913 in Cleveland, Ohio, by the Federation for Charity and Philanthropy.

== History ==
Between 1919 and 1929, the number of Community Chest organizations increased from 39 to 353, surpassing 1,000 by 1948. After several name changes, in 1963 the term "United Way" was adopted in the United States, whereas the United Way/Centraide name was not adopted in Canada until 1973–1974.

The Community Chest was promoted on several old-time radio shows, including the H. J. Heinz Company–sponsored The Adventures of Ozzie and Harriet show, the S. C. Johnson & Son–sponsored Fibber McGee and Molly show, and the Chevron-sponsored Let George Do It show.

Some local organizations continue to use the Community Chest name, such as Concord-Carlisle Community Chest in Concord, Massachusetts.

== Legacy ==
The term "Community Chest" continues to be used as the name for a gameplay feature in the board game Monopoly.

== See also ==
- The Community Chest of Hong Kong
- United Givers Fund
- Whiting Williams
