= Management science =

Study of problem-solving in human organizations

Management science (or managerial science) is an interdisciplinary study of solving complex problems and making strategic decisions as it pertains to institutions, corporations, governments and other types of organizational entities. It is closely related to management, economics, business, engineering, management consulting, and other fields. It uses various scientific research-based principles, strategies, and analytical methods including mathematical modeling, statistics and numerical algorithms and aims to improve an organization's ability to enact rational and accurate management decisions by arriving at optimal or near optimal solutions to complex decision problems.

Management science looks to help businesses achieve goals using a number of scientific methods. The field was initially an outgrowth of applied mathematics, where early challenges were problems relating to the optimization of systems which could be modeled linearly, i.e., determining the optima (maximum value of profit, assembly line performance, crop yield, bandwidth, etc. or minimum of loss, risk, costs, etc.) of some objective function. Today, the discipline of management science may encompass a diverse range of managerial and organizational activity as it regards to a problem which is structured in mathematical or other quantitative form in order to derive managerially relevant insights and solutions.

== Overview ==
Management science is concerned with a number of areas of study:

- Developing and applying models and concepts that may prove useful in helping to illuminate management issues and solve managerial problems. The models used can often be represented mathematically, but sometimes computer-based, visual or verbal representations are used as well or instead.
- Designing and developing new and better models of organizational excellence.
- Helping to improve, stabilize or otherwise manage profit margins in enterprises.

Management science research can be done on three levels:

- The fundamental level lies in three mathematical disciplines: probability, optimization, and dynamical systems theory.
- The modeling level is about building models, analyzing them mathematically, gathering and analyzing data, implementing models on computers, solving them, experimenting with them—all this is part of management science research on the modeling level. This level is mainly instrumental, and driven mainly by statistics and econometrics.
- The application level, just as in any other engineering and economics disciplines, strives to make a practical impact and be a driver for change in the real world.

The management scientist's mandate is to use rational, systematic and science-based techniques to inform and improve decisions of all kinds. The techniques of management science are not restricted to business applications but may be applied to military, medical, public administration, charitable groups, political groups or community groups. The norm for scholars in management science is to focus their work in a certain area or subfield of management like public administration, finance, calculus, information and so forth.

== History ==
Frederick Winslow Taylor helped develop the field of management science in the early 20th century. Likewise, administration expert Luther Gulick and management expert Peter Drucker both had an impact on the development of management science in the 1930s and 1940s. Drucker said, "the purpose of the corporation is to be economically efficient." This thought process is foundational to management science. In 1910, Louis Brandeis was the creator of a new business approach which he coined as "scientific management", a term that is often falsely attributed to the aforementioned Frederick Winslow Taylor.

The origins of management science can be traced to operations research, which became influential during World War II when the Allied forces recruited scientists of various disciplines to assist with military operations. In these early applications, the scientists used simple mathematical models to make efficient use of limited technologies and resources. The application of these models to the corporate sector became known as management science.

In 1967 Stafford Beer characterized the field of management science as "the business use of operations research".

== Theory ==
Some of the fields that management science involves include:

- Contract theory
- Data mining
- Decision analysis
- Engineering
- Forecasting
- Marketing
- Finance
- Operations
- Game theory
- Industrial engineering
- Logistics
- Management consulting
- Mathematical modeling
- Optimization
- Operational research
- Probability and statistics
- Project management
- Psychology
- Simulation
- Social network / Transportation forecasting models
- Sociology
- Supply chain management

== See also ==
- Fayolism
- Institute for Operations Research and the Management Sciences
- John von Neumann Theory Prize
- Managerial economics
- Management engineering
- Management cybernetics
- Innovation management
- Organization studies
- Outline of management
