= Journal of Management =

- Discipline: Management
- Language: English
- Edited by: Cynthia E. Devers

Publication details
- History: 1975-present
- Publisher: SAGE Publications for the Southern Management Association
- Frequency: 8/year
- Impact factor: 9.3 (2023)

Standard abbreviations
- ISO 4: J. Manag.

Indexing
- CODEN: JOMADO
- ISSN: 0149-2063 (print); 1557-1211 (web)
- LCCN: 79644536
- OCLC no.: 311545277

Links
- Journal homepage; Online access; Online archive

The Journal of Management is a peer-reviewed academic journal published by SAGE Publications for the Southern Management Association and covering research on all aspects of management as well as the related field of industrial and organizational psychology. Special issues containing review articles only are published biannually in January and July. It is an official journal of the Southern Management Association. The journal was established in 1975 and the editor-in-chief is Cynthia E. Devers (Virginia Tech).

== Abstracting and indexing ==
The journal is abstracted and indexed in:

- Current Contents/Social & Behavioral Sciences
- EBSCO Business Source
- International Bibliography of the Social Sciences
- LexisNexis
- PAIS International
- PsycINFO
- Scopus
- Social Sciences Citation Index
- VINITI Database RAS

According to the Journal Citation Reports the journal has a 2022 impact factor of 6.3.
