= Fayolism =

Management theory developed by Henri Fayol

Fayolism was a theory of management that analyzed and synthesized the role of management in organizations, developed around 1900 by the French manager and management theorist Henri Fayol (1841–1925). It was through Fayol's work as a philosopher of administration that he contributed most widely to the theory and practice of organizational management.

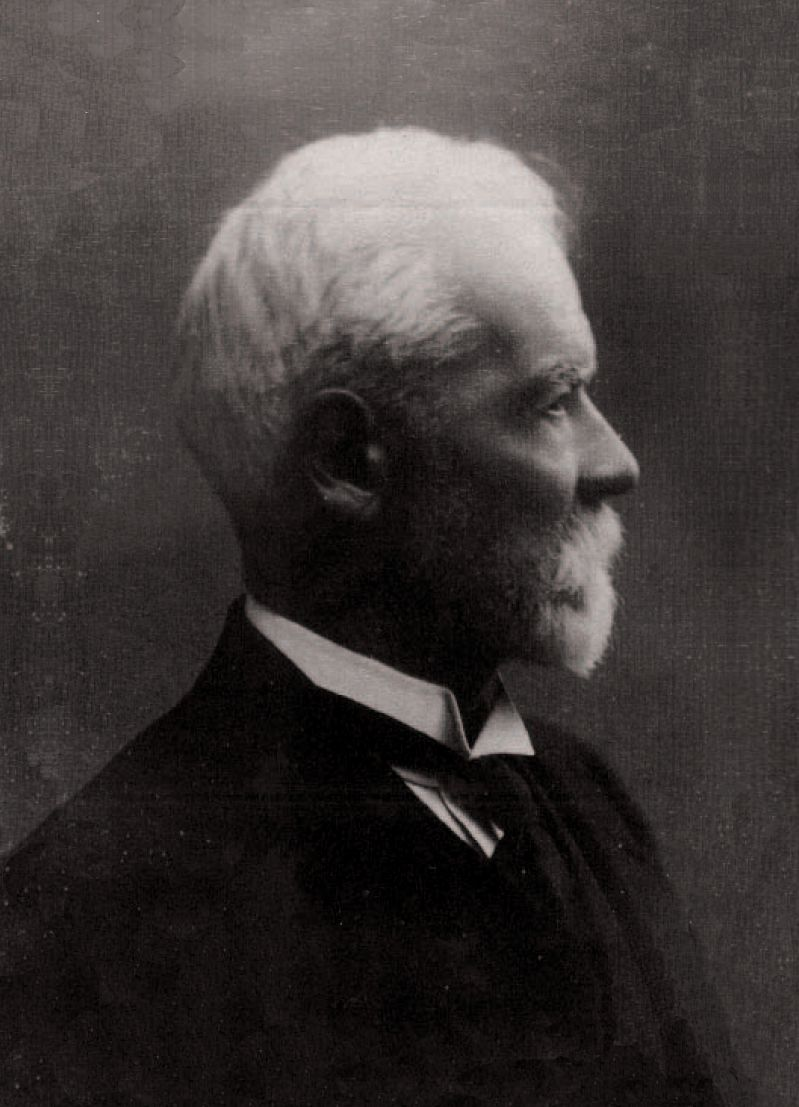
Henri Fayol

== Research and teaching of management ==
Fayol served as the CEO of Compagnie de Commentry-Fourchambault-Decazeville from 1888 onward and methodically analysed the company's operations. He believed that by focusing on managerial practices, he could minimize misunderstandings and increase organizational efficiency. He instructed managers on how to fulfill their duties and the specific practices they should adopt. In his book General and Industrial Management (published in French in 1916 and in English in 1949), Fayol outlined a theory of general management that he believed could be applied across myriad industries. His primary concern was with the administrative apparatus, or functions of administration. To that end, he presented his administrative theory, which consisted of both principles and elements of management.

He believed in control and a strict, tree-like, chain of command. Unity of command, the principle that workers should receive orders from only one superior, was one of his major mottoes. He believed that while production and productivity were important, they were not the only factors for success. Other departments (such as sales, finance, and accounting) and human-centric focuses (such as safety, harmony, and unity of purpose) were equally vital. However, General and Industrial Management reveals that Fayol advocated for a flexible approach to management, applicable to various contexts including the home, the workplace, or the state. He stressed the practice of forecasting and planning to adapt to any situation. He also outlines an agenda where every citizen would receive management education, allowing them to exercise these abilities starting in school and continuing into the workplace.

Everyone needs some concepts of management; in the home, in affairs of state, the need for managerial ability is in keeping with the importance of the undertaking, and for individual people the need is everywhere in greater accordance with the position occupied.

— excerpt from General and Industrial Management

== Fayol vs. Frederick Taylor's Scientific Management ==
Fayol has been regarded by many as the father of the modern operational management theory, and his ideas have become a fundamental part of modern management concepts. Fayol is often compared to Frederick Winslow Taylor, who developed Scientific Management. Taylor's system of Scientific Management is the cornerstone of classical theory. Fayol was also a classical theorist. While Taylor knew nothing of Fayol, Fayol read Taylor and referred to him in his writing. He considered him a visionary and pioneer in the management of organizations, and praised him, but also criticized some points.

Fayol differed from Taylor in his focus. Taylor's main focus was on the task, whereas Fayol was more concerned with management. Taylor's Scientific Management deals with the efficient organization of production in the context of a competitive enterprise concerned with controlling production costs. Fayol, however, left this to the technical executives and operatives, and put emphasis on the leadership, orderly organization, communication, and harmony between departments, what he called administration. According to Fayol, administration applies to virtually every business and organisation (including non-profit, churches, armies, etc.), whether small or large. Another difference between the two theorists is their treatment of workers. Fayol appears to have slightly more respect for the worker than Taylor had, as evidenced by Fayol's proclamation that workers may indeed be motivated by more than just money, and his practice of giving them opportunities to learn and move up the ladder. Fayol also argued for equity in the treatment of workers. He discussed how workers should receive their wages, whether this should be fixed salaries, bonus payments, or a portion of the dividends. He also considered different bases for pay, such as calculation by time worked, tasks completed, or units produced.

According to Claude George (1968), a primary difference between Fayol and Taylor was that Taylor viewed management processes from the bottom up, while Fayol viewed it from the top down. In Fayol's book General and Industrial Management, Fayol wrote that:

Taylor's approach differs from the one we have outlined in that he examines the firm from the bottom up. He starts with the most elemental units of activity—the workers' actions—then studies the effects of their actions on productivity, devises new methods for making them more efficient, and applies what he learns at lower levels to the hierarchy...

— Fayol, 1987, p. 43

He suggests that Taylor has staff analysts and advisors working with individuals at lower levels of the organization to identify ways to improve efficiency. According to Fayol, this approach results in a "negation of the principle of unity of command". Fayol criticized Taylor’s functional management in this way:

… the most marked outward characteristics of functional management lies in the fact that each workman, instead of coming in direct contact with the management at one point only, … receives his daily orders and help from eight different bosses…

— Fayol, 1949, p. 68.

Those eight, Fayol said, were:

1. route clerks,
2. instruction card men
3. cost and time clerks
4. gang bosses
5. speed bosses
6. inspectors
7. repair bosses, and the
8. shop disciplinarian (p. 68).

This, he said, was an unworkable situation, and that Taylor must have somehow reconciled the dichotomy in a way not described in Taylor's works, but crucial for it to actually work in the field.

Fayol's desire for teaching a generalized theory of management stemmed from the belief that each individual of an organization, at one point or another, takes on duties that involve managerial decisions. This contrasts with Taylor, who believed management activity was the exclusive duty of an organization's dominant class. Fayol's approach was more in sync with his idea of Authority, which stated, "...that the right to give orders should not be considered without the acceptance and understanding of responsibility."

Noted as one of the early fathers of the Human Relations movement, Fayol expressed ideas and practices different from Taylor's, showing flexibility and adaptation, and stressing the importance of interpersonal interaction among employees.

=== Fayol's Principles of Management ===
During the early 20th century, Fayol developed 14 principles of management to help managers manage their affairs more effectively. Organizations in technologically advanced countries interpret these principles quite differently from the way they were interpreted during Fayol's time. These differences in interpretation are in part a result of the cultural challenges managers face when implementing this framework. The fourteen principles are:

1. Division of work
2. Delegation of authority and responsibilities
3. Discipline
4. Unity of commands
5. Unity of direction
6. Subordination or Interrelation between individual interests and common organizational goals
7. Compensation package or Remuneration
8. Centralization And Decentralisation
9. Scalar chains
10. Order
11. Equity
12. Job guarantee or Stability of Employees
13. Initiatives
14. Team-Spirit or Esprit de corps

Fayol goes on to describe how each organizational component has certain properties attached to it, depending on its role in contributing to the organization or group. This essential function, or activities, corresponds to a set of abilities that are appropriate in order to carry out the duties associated with the properties of this essential function, or activities. In order to match this specified set of abilities that are required for the organizational role, a profile of which number of requisite abilities necessary for the role in question has to be established. This thesis has since been subject to application in 21st century organizational theory.

=== Fayol's Elements (or functions) of Management ===
Within his theory, Fayol outlined five elements of management that depict the kinds of behaviors managers should engage in so that the goals and objectives of an organization are effectively met. The five elements of management are:

1. Planning: creating a plan of action for the future, determining the stages of the plan and the technology necessary to implement it. Deciding in advance what to do, how to do it, when to do it, and who should do it. It maps the path from where the organization is to where it wants to be. The planning function involves establishing goals and arranging them in a logical order. Administrators engage in both short-range and long-range planning.
2. Organizing: Once a plan of action is designed, managers need to provide everything necessary to carry it out; including raw materials, tools, capital and human resources. Identifying responsibilities, grouping them into departments or divisions, and specifying organizational relationships.
3. Command: Managers need to implement the plan. They must have an understanding of the strengths and weaknesses of their personnel. Leading people in a manner that achieves the goals of the organization requires proper allocation of resources and an effective support system. Directing requires exceptional interpersonal skills and the ability to motivate people. One of the crucial issues in directing is the correct balance between staff needs and production.
4. Coordination: High-level managers must work to "harmonize" all the activities to facilitate organizational success. Communication is the prime coordinating mechanism. Synchronizes the elements of the organization and must take into account delegation of authority and responsibility and span of control within units.
5. Control: The final element of management involves the comparison of the activities of the personnel to the plan of action, it is the evaluation component of management. Monitoring function that evaluates quality in all areas and detects potential or actual deviations from the organization's plan, ensuring high-quality performance and satisfactory results while maintaining an orderly and problem-free environment. Controlling includes information management, measurement of performance, and institution of corrective actions.

=== Effects of Written Communication ===
Fayol believed that animosity and unease within the workplace occurred among employees in different departments. Many of these "misunderstandings" were thought to be caused by improper communication, mainly through letters (or in present-day emails). Among scholars of organizational communication and psychology, letters were perceived to induce or solidify a hierarchical structure within the organization. Through this type of vertical communication, many individuals gained a false feeling of importance. Furthermore, it gave way to selfish thinking and eventual conflict among employees in the workplace.

This concept was expressed in Fayol's book, General and Industrial Management, by stating," in some firms... employees in neighboring departments with numerous points of contact, or even employees within a department, who could quite easily meet, communicate with each other in writing... there is to be observed a certain amount of animosity prevailing between different departments or different employees within a department. The system of written communication usually brings this result. There is a way of putting an end to this deplorable system ... and that is to forbid all communication in writing which could easily and advantageously be replaced by verbal ones."

== Administrative theory in the modern workplace ==
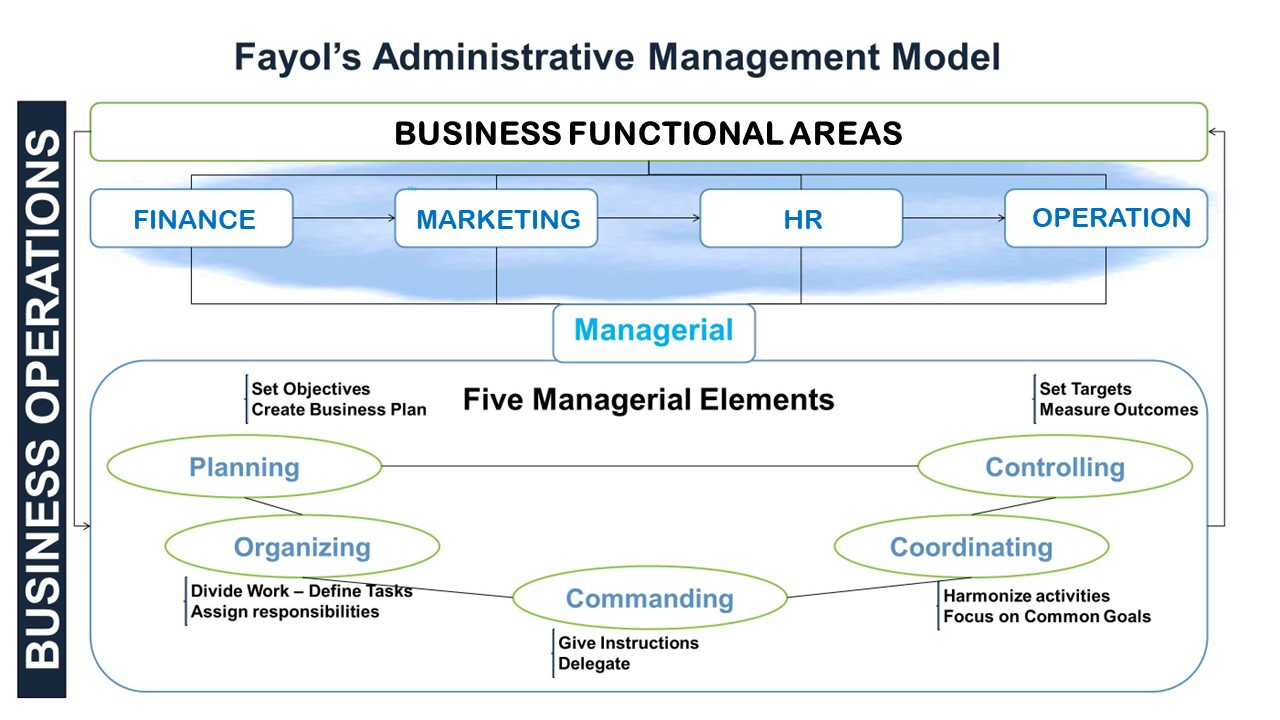

Fayol believed that managerial practices were key to predictability and efficiency in organizations. The administrative theory views communication as a necessary ingredient to successful management and many of Fayol's practices are still alive in today's workplace. The elements and principles of management can be found in modern organizations in several ways: as accepted practices in some industries, as revamped versions of the original principles or elements, or as remnants of the organization's history to which alternative practices and philosophies are being offered.

== See also ==
- Innovation management
- Management science
- Managerial economics
- Organization theory
