= David Clutterbuck =

Vice-Admiral Sir David Clutterbuck KBE CB
- Born: 25 January 1913
- Died: 13 December 2008 (aged 95)
- Military career
- Allegiance: United Kingdom
- Branch: Royal Navy
- Service years: 1929–1968
- Rank: Vice-Admiral
- Commands: HMS Sluys; HMS Cadiz; HMS Blake
- Conflicts: World War II
- Awards: Knight Commander of the Order of the British Empire; Companion of the Order of the Bath

Vice-Admiral Sir David Granville Clutterbuck KBE CB (25 January 1913 – 13 December 2008) was a Royal Navy officer who became NATO's Deputy Supreme Allied Commander Atlantic in 1966.

== Naval career ==
Educated at HMS Conway (school ship), Clutterbuck joined the Royal Navy in 1929. He served in World War II on the cruiser HMS Ajax, seeing action in the Eastern Mediterranean Sea; escorting several Malta relief convoys, landing (and then evacuating) Allied troops from Greece, and being present at the Battle of Cape Matapan. His next ship was the heavy cruiser HMS Newfoundland taking part in the invasion of Sicily. After the war he commanded the destroyers HMS Sluys and HMS Cadiz. He was appointed naval attaché in Bonn in 1954, Captain of the cruiser HMS Blake in 1960 and Chief of Staff to the Commander-in-Chief Home Fleet in 1963. He went on to be Deputy Supreme Allied Commander Atlantic in 1966 and retired in 1968.

== Civilian life ==
After retiring from military life, Sir David Clutterbuck became the first Director General of the Association of MBAs in 1969 (which carried the name Business Graduates Association until 1987).

== Family ==
In 1937 he married Rose Mere Vaile; they had two daughters.

Military offices
Preceded by Sir William Beloe	Deputy Supreme Allied Commander Atlantic; 1966–1968	Succeeded by Sir Peter Compston
