= Stuart Crainer =

British management journalist and business theorist

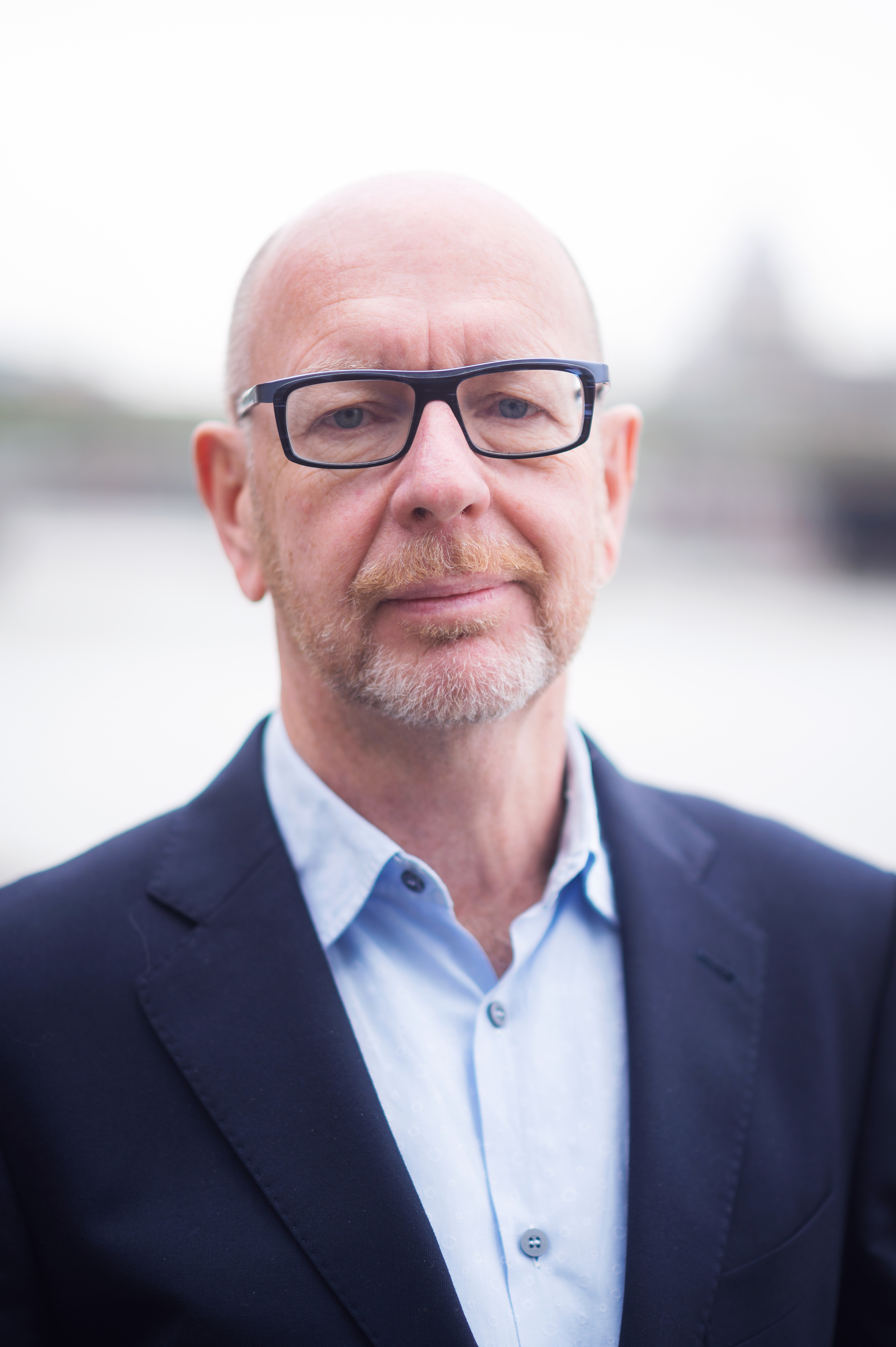
- Born: 1962
- Occupation: Co-founder of Thinkers50

Stuart Crainer (born 1962) is an author, editor, adviser and entrepreneur.

He is co-founder of Thinkers50, the global platform for management ideas. His book credits include The Financial Times Handbook of Management, The Management Century and a biography of the management guru Tom Peters.

He is a former columnist to The (London) Times and contributing editor to the American magazine Strategy+Business.

In the 1990s he also worked as a ghostwriter on a number of bestselling business books and was editor of the award-winning magazine Business Strategy Review.

His long-time co-author and business partner is Des Dearlove. Their books, available in more than 15 languages, include Gravy Training and Generation Entrepreneur. His work with Dearlove in business thought leadership led Management Today to describe them as “market makers par excellence”.

Crainer is an adjunct professor at IE Business School in Madrid, director of the Business Ecosystem Alliance and is also the author of Atlantic Crossing.

== Selected publications ==
- The Decline and Rise of British Industry (with David Clutterbuck), Mercury, 1988
- Makers of Management (with David Clutterbuck), Macmillan, 1990
- Zeebrugge: Learning from Disaster, HFA, 1993
- What Do High Performance Managers Really Do? (with Phil Hodgson), Pitman, 1993
- The Financial Times Handbook of Management (ed.), FT Pitman, 1995
- The Real Power of Brands, Pitman, 1995
- Making Re-engineering Happen (with Eddie Obeng), Pitman, 1995
- How to Have a Brilliant Career, Pitman, 1995
- The Future of Leadership (with Phil Hodgson and Randall White), Financial Times Prentice Hall, 1996
- The Tom Peters Phenomenon, Capstone, 1997
- The Ultimate Business Library, Capstone, 1997
- The Ultimate Business Guru Book, Capstone, 1997
- The Ultimate Book of Business Quotations, Capstone, 1997
- Leaders on Leadership (ed.), Pitman, 1998
- Key Management Ideas, Financial Times Pitman, 1998
- Which Executive Programme?, Economist Intelligence Unit, 1998
- Gravy Training: Inside the Business of Business School, Jossey Bass, 1999
- The 75 Greatest Management Decisions, Amacom, 1999
- The Ultimate Book of Business Brands, Capstone, 1999
- The Freethinker’s A-Z of the New World of Business, Capstone, 1999
- MBA Planet (with Des Dearlove), Financial Times Prentice Hall, 2000
- The Financial Times Handbook of Management (ed. second edition), FT Pitman, 2000
- Generation Entrepreneur (with Des Dearlove), Financial Times Prentice Hall, 2000
- The Management Century, Jossey Bass, 2000
- Business Minds (with Tom Brown, Des Dearlove and Jorge Nascimento Rodrigues), FT Prentice Hall, 2001
- Firestarters! (with Des Dearlove), Financial Times Prentice Hall, 2001
- Leadership the Sven-Goran Eriksson Way (with Julian Birkinshaw), Capstone, 2002
- The Career Adventurer’s Fieldbook (with Steve Coomber and Des Dearlove), Capstone, 2002
- Business, the Universe and Everything (with Des Dearlove), Capstone, 2003
- The Financial Times Handbook of Management (ed. with Des Dearlove, third edition), Financial Times Prentice Hall, 2004
- The Business World Atlas (with Des Dearlove), Meteor Press, 2006
- Atlantic Crossing, St Giles Poets, 2015
- Dear CEO (with Des Dearlove, editors), Bloomsbury, 2017
- Ecosystems Inc. (editor), Thinkers50, 2020
