= Des Dearlove =

British business journalist and theorist

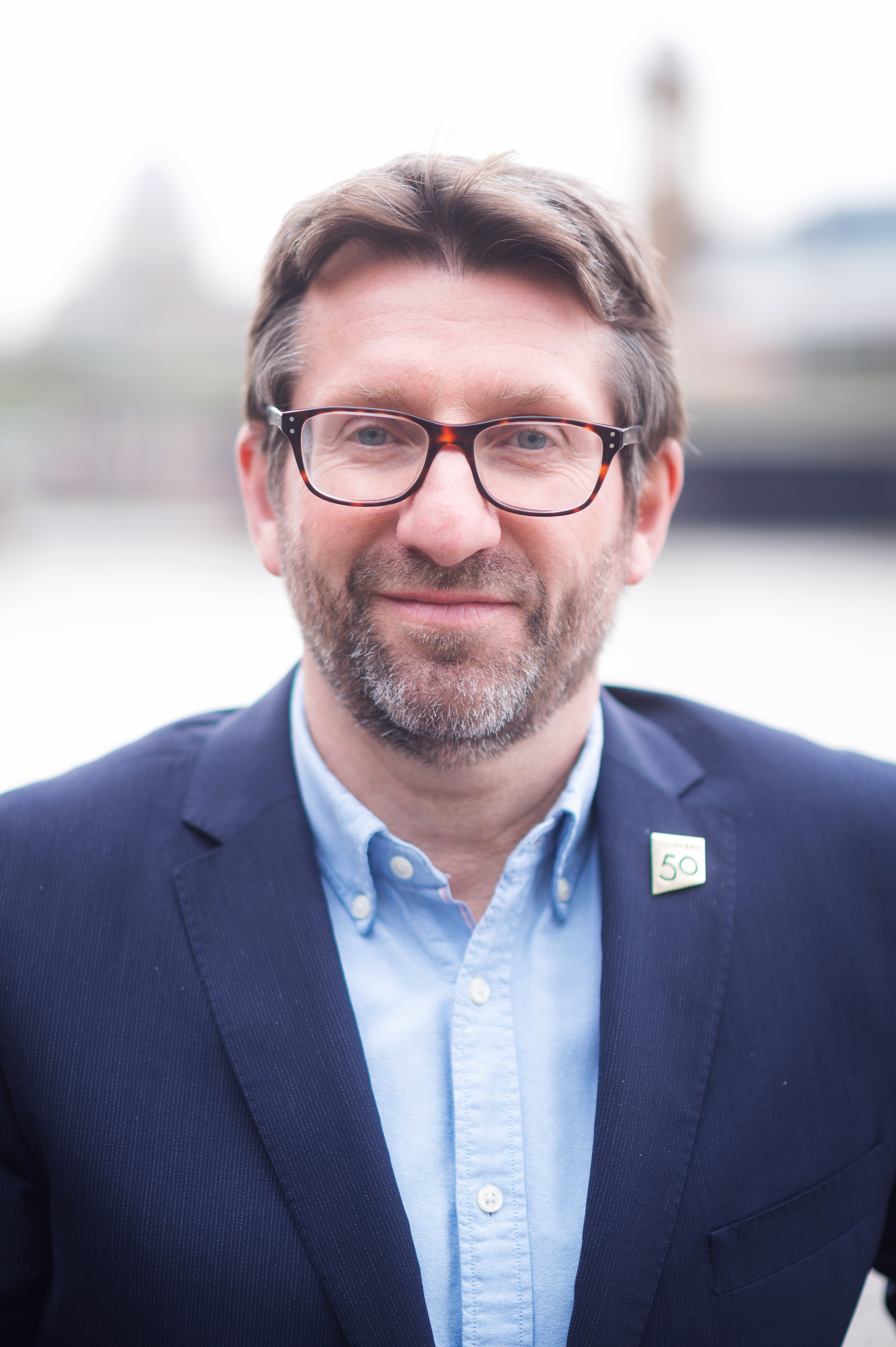
- Born: 1963 (age 62–63)
- Other names: Dearlove, Desmond
- Occupation: Co-founder of Thinkers50

Des Dearlove (born 1963) is a British business journalist and management theorist, known for his work on the history and state-of-the-art of management theory.

As a commentator on management thinking for over two decades, Dearlove has championed the leading management ideas through Thinkers50, the first global ranking of management thinkers, which he co-founded in 2001 with Stuart Crainer.

Thinkers50 is an organization that ranks and publishes management and business ideas.

Dearlove is a former columnist to The (London) Times, and contributing editor to Strategy+Business. He was the co-editor (with Stuart Crainer) of the Financial Times Handbook of Management.

Dearlove and Crainer are the authors of a number of books, including Generation Entrepreneur (FT.com); Gravy Training: Inside the Business of Business Schools (Jossey-Bass), and The Ultimate Book of Business Thinking (Capstone).

Dearlove has taught at leading business schools, including IE Business School, and the Said Business School at Oxford University, where he is an associate fellow. He is an adjunct professor at IE Business School.

Under the pen name of D.D. Everest, Dearlove is also the author of the Archie Greene trilogy of children's books (Faber & Faber). In 2014, Archie Greene and the Magician’s Secret was shortlisted for the National Book Awards.

== Selected publications ==
- Actions Speak Louder (with David Clutterbuck and Deborah Snow), Kogan Page, 1992
- Key Management Decisions, FT Pitman, 1998
- The Interim Manager (with David Clutterbuck), FT Pitman, 1999
- The Ultimate Business Guru Book, (with Stuart Crainer) Capstone, 1997
- Gravy Training: Inside the Business of Business School, (with Stuart Crainer) Jossey Bass, 1999
- The Ultimate Book of Business Brands, (with Stuart Crainer) Capstone, 1999
- MBA Planet (with Stuart Crainer), Financial Times Prentice Hall, 2000
- The Financial Times Handbook of Management (ed. second edition), FT Pitman, 2000
- Generation Entrepreneur (with Stuart Crainer), FT.com, 2000
- Business Minds (with Tom Brown, Stuart Crainer and Jorge Nascimento Rodrigues), FT Prentice Hall, 2001
- Firestarters! (with Stuart Crainer), Financial Times Prentice Hall, 2001
- The Financial Times Guide to Business Travel, (edited with Stuart Crainer), 2001
- The Career Adventurer’s Fieldbook (with Steve Coomber and Stuart Crainer), Capstone, 2002
- The Ultimate Book of Business Thinking, Capstone, 2003
- Business, the Universe and Everything (with Stuart Crainer), Capstone, 2003
- The Financial Times Handbook of Management (ed. with Stuart Crainer, third edition), Financial Times Prentice Hall, 2004
- The Business World Atlas (with Stuart Crainer), Meteor Press, 2006
- Archie Greene and the Magician’s Secret, (under the pen name of D.D Everest) Faber & Faber, 2014
- Archie Greene and the Alchemist’s Curse, (under the pen name of D.D Everest) Faber & Faber, 2016
- Archie Greene and the Raven’s Spell, (under the pen name of D.D Everest) Faber & Faber, 2017
- Dear CEO (with Stuart Crainer, editors), Bloomsbury, 2017
