= List of business theorists =

This is an annotated list of important business writers. It is in alphabetical order based on last name.

== A ==
- David Aaker (born 1938) - marketing, brand strategy
- Wil van der Aalst
- James Abegglen (1926–2007) - management and business in Japan
- Bodo Abel
- Russell L. Ackoff (1919–2009) - operations research, organizational theory
- John Adair (born 1934) - leadership
- Karol Adamiecki (1866–1933) - management
- Ichak Adizes
- Charles Constance César Joseph Matthieu d'Agoult
- Yoji Akao
- Ali Akdemir
- Howard E. Aldrich (born 1940s) - American sociologist and organizational theorist
- Leon P. Alford (1877–1942) - scientific management
- Tim Ambler (1938–2024) - marketing effectiveness
- Igor Ansoff (1918–2002) - strategic management
- Ingeman Arbnor
- Chris Argyris (1923–2013) - learning systems, learning organization
- Horace Lucian Arnold (1837–1915)
- Neal Ashkanasy

== B ==
- Stephen R. Barley (born 1953) - technology, organizational change, organizational culture
- Chester Barnard (1886–1961) - management
- Gary S. Becker
- Charles Bedaux (1886–1944) - scientific management
- Warren Bennis (1925–2014) - leadership studies
- Per Olof Berg (born 1946) - Swedish organizational theorist
- Manfred Berliner
- Björn Bjerke
- Patrick Blackett, Baron Blackett (1897–1974) - operations research
- Ken Blanchard
- Charles Bosanquet
- Matthew Boulton (1728–1809) - labor productivity
- Marvin Bower
- Richard Boyatzis (born 1946) - emotional intelligence, behavior change, and competence
- Leland Lawrence Briggs (1893–1975) - American accounting scholar
- John Seely Brown
- Wilfred Brown, Baron Brown
- Nils Brunsson (born 1946) - institutionalized hypocrisy of organizations
- Lawton Burns (born c. 1950) - health care systems

== C ==
- Noel Capon
- Charles U. Carpenter
- Jean-Luc Cerdin
- James A. Champy - business process reengineering (1990s)
- Alfred D. Chandler, Jr. - management, Pulitzer Prize for The Visible Hand: The Managerial Revolution in American Business (1977)
- Clayton M. Christensen
- Alexander Hamilton Church - industrial management (1900s–1910s)
- C. West Churchman
- Stewart Clegg
- Ronald Coase - transaction costs, Coase theorem, theory of the firm (1950s) (Nobel Prize in 1991)
- James C. Collins - vision statement, strategic planning and BHAG (1990s)
- Morris Llewellyn Cooke
- Cary Cooper
- Stephen Covey
- Philip B. Crosby
- Richard Cyert
- Barbara Czarniawska

== D ==
- Robert Dahlstrom (born 1958) - American organizational theorist, works on international marketing
- David Dale
- Thomas H. Davenport
- George S. Day - marketing (1970s)
- Jeff DeGraff
- Morris H. DeGroot
- W. Edwards Deming - statistical quality control (1950s, 1960s)
- Daniel R. Denison
- Eric Dent
- Hugo Diemer - industrial engineering (1910s)
- Jan Dietz
- Patrick Dixon
- Henk van Dongen
- Sytse Douma
- Wiebe Draijer
- Peter Drucker (1909–2005) - management (1950s, 1960s, 1970s, 1980s)
- Anna Dubois (born 1962) - Swedish organizational theorist
- Peter Dunn

== E ==
- Andrew S.C. Ehrenberg
- Michael Eisner
- Chester Elton
- Tunç Erem
- Richard F. Ericson
- Hans-Erik Eriksson (born 1961) - Swedish computer scientist and organizational theorist
- Agner Krarup Erlang
- Hamid Etemad

== F ==
- Henri Fayol - management (1910s)
- Armand V. Feigenbaum - quality control (1950s)
- Tim Ferriss
- Harry Anson Finney (1886–1966) - American accountancy author
- Ronald Fisher - statistics (1920s)
- Mary Follett - organizational studies (1930s)
- Nicolai J. Foss
- R. Edward Freeman
- Mike L. Fry
- Adrian Furnham

== G ==
- John Kenneth Galbraith - The New Industrial State (1967)
- Henry Gantt - Gantt chart (20th century)
- Burleigh B. Gardner (1902–1985) - motivation research
- Michael Gerber - E-Myth Revisited
- Jamshid Gharajedaghi (born 1940) - American organizational theorist, management consultant, and Adjunct Professor of Systems Thinking
- Sumantra Ghoshal
- John P. van Gigch
- Frank Bunker Gilbreth, Sr.
- Frank Gilbreth - time and motion study (20th century)
- Seth Godin
- Eliyahu M. Goldratt - theory of constraints (1980s)
- Marshall Goldsmith
- Daniel Goleman
- Vytautas Andrius Graiciunas - management (1933)
- Lynda Gratton
- C. Jackson Grayson
- Danny Greefhorst (born 1972) - Dutch enterprise architect
- James Bray Griffith (1871–1937) - American business theorist
- William H. Gruber (born 1935) - American organizational theorist
- Erich Gutenberg - theory of the firm (1950s)

== H ==
- Stephan H. Haeckel
- Stephen G. Haines
- Noel Frederick Hall
- Brian Halligan
- Gary Hamel (born 1954) - core competency, strategic management (1990s)
- Michael Hammer - business process reengineering (1990s)
- Charles Handy - organisational behaviour (1990s)
- Paul Harmon - management author
- G. Charter Harrison (1881–1959) - Anglo-American management consultant and cost account pioneer
- Sven A. Haugland (born 1948) - Norwegian organizational theorist
- David L. Hawk
- Igor Hawryszkiewycz (born 1948) - American computer scientist and organizational theorist
- Robert Heller
- Frederick Herzberg - two factor theory, motivation theory, job enrichment (1970s)
- Steen Hildebrandt
- Charles DeLano Hine
- Geert Hofstede
- Kenneth Hopper
- Yasheng Huang
- Albert S Humphrey - strategic planning, SWOT analysis (1970s, 1980s)
- Shelby D. Hunt
- Walter Hunziker

== I ==
- Masaaki Imai (1930–2023) - Kaizen (continuous improvement) (1980s, 1990s, 2000s)
- Kaoru Ishikawa (1915–1989) - Ishikawa diagram in industrial process; quality circles (1960s)

== J ==
- Mike Jackson - systems scientist
- Lars Jaeger
- John Jantsch
- Dave Jenks
- Anita Jose
- Joseph M. Juran (1904–2008) - quality control, especially quality circles (1960s, 1970s)

== K ==
- Rosabeth Moss Kanter - business management and change management (1977)
- Robert S. Kaplan - management accounting and balanced scorecard (1990s)
- Dexter Keezer
- Kevin Lane Keller
- Roy B. Kester (1882–1965) - American accountancy scholar
- Tarun Khanna
- Walter Kickert (born 1950) - Dutch academic and professor of public management
- John Warren Kindt
- Charles Edward Knoeppel
- Richard Koch
- Lars Kolind
- Monika Kostera
- Philip Kotler - marketing management and social marketing (1970s, 1980s, 1990s)
- John Kotter - organizational behaviour and management (1980s, 1990s)
- Vladimir Kvint - strategy

== L ==
- John Christian Langli
- Jean-Claude Larréché
- Kyoung Jun Lee
- William Henry Leffingwell - office management (1910s–1940s)
- Paul Leonardi
- Harry Levinson
- Theodore Levitt - marketing and globalization (1960s, 1970s)
- Michael Lewis
- Peter Lindgren (born 1961) - Danish organizational theorist
- John Lintner - capital asset pricing model (1970s)
- Ted London
- Juan Antonio Pérez López
- Jay Lorsch
- Michael Lounsbury
- Randi Lunnan (born 1963) - Norwegian organizational theorist, works on strategic alliances
- Reijo Luostarinen (1939–2017) - Finnish organisational theorist
- James Alexander Lyons (1861–1920) - American accountancy author

== M ==
- John Van Maanen
- James MacGregor Burns
- Kenneth D. Mackenzie
- Teemu Malmi (born 1965) - Finnish organizational theorist
- Vincent Mangematin
- James G. March - theory of the firm (1960s)
- Constantinos Markides - strategic management and strategy dynamics (1990s)
- Harry Markowitz - modern portfolio theory (1960s, 1970s), Nobel Prize in 1990
- Perry Marshall
- John C. Maxwell - leadership (1990s, 2000s, 2010s)
- Elton Mayo - job satisfaction and Hawthorne effect (1920s, 1930s)
- John H. McArthur
- Daniel McCallum - organizational charts (1850s)
- Douglas McGregor
- Dalton McGuinty, Sr.
- Geoff Meeks (born 1949) - British accounting scholar
- Lucas Meijs
- Leo Melamed - currency futures and derivatives (1980s, 1990s)
- Gary Metcalf
- Henry C. Metcalf - the science of administration (1920s)
- Henry Metcalfe - the science of administration (1880s)
- Gerald Midgley
- Danny Miller - economist
- Merton Miller - Modigliani–Miller theorem and corporate finance (1970s)
- Henry Mintzberg (born 1939) - organizational architecture, strategic management (1970s–2000s)
- Franco Modigliani - Modigliani–Miller theorem and corporate finance (1970s)
- Geoffrey Moore
- Richard Moran
- Gareth Morgan
- Gerry Morgan
- Silvina Moschini
- Hugo Münsterberg - psychology of work (1910s)
- J. Keith Murnighan
- Christa Muth

== N ==
- Peter Naudé - marketing and business networks
- Nicholas Negroponte - human-computer interaction (1970s–1990s)
- Nobuo Noda - Japanese business scholar
- Kjell A. Nordström
- Arne Nygaard (born 1957) - Norwegian organizational theorist

== O ==
- George S. Odiorne - management by objectives
- Kenichi Ohmae - 3C's model and strategic management (1970s, 1980s)
- Taiichi Ohno - Toyota Production System, lean manufacturing, just in time (1980s)
- David Ogilvy - advertising (1960s–1980s)
- Sharon Oster
- William Ouchi - Theory Z (1980s)
- Robert Owen - cooperatives (1810s)

== P ==
- Luca Pacioli - double-entry bookkeeping system and financial statements (1494)
- Javier Perez-Capdevila - strategic management and business analysis and valuation
- Krishna Palepu - business analysis and valuation, financial statements
- Scott Patterson
- Keith Pavitt - innovation clusters and innovation taxonomy (1970s through 2000)
- Edith Penrose - The Theory of the Growth of the Firm (1959)
- Juan Antonio Pérez López - negative learning (1990s)
- Oscar E. Perrigo - shop management (1900s)
- Laurence J. Peter - Peter Principle (1970s)
- Thomas J. Peters - management (1970s, 1980s)
- Jeffrey Pfeffer - organizational development (1970s–?)
- Robert Allen Phillips
- Rebecca Piekkari (born 1967) - Finnish organizational theorist
- Henry Varnum Poor - principles of organization (1850s–?)
- Michael Porter - strategic management and Porter's 5 forces (1970s–1990s)
- C. K. Prahalad (1941–2010) - core competency (1980s)
- Derek S. Pugh

== R ==
- J. Donald R. de Raadt
- Navi Radjou
- N. Ravichandaran
- Jeffrey Rayport
- W. Charles Redding
- Robert Reich
- Fred Reichheld
- Reg Revans
- Jeremy Rifkin
- Fritz Roethlisberger
- Georges Romme
- Mike Rother

== S ==
- Martti Saario (1906–1988) - Finnish organizational theorist and Professor of Accounting
- Kenan Sahin
- Jason Saul
- August-Wilhelm Scheer
- Edgar Schein
- Eugen Schmalenbach - economic value added (1920s–?)
- Hein Schreuder
- David Meerman Scott (born 1961) - inbound marketing and PR in the Internet era (2008-)
- Walter Dill Scott - psychology of personnel management (1920s)
- Esbjörn Segelod (born 1951) - Swedish organizational theorist
- Peter Senge
- Dorian Shainin
- Stanley J. Shapiro
- Seena Sharp
- Oliver Sheldon - business philosophy (1920s)
- Walter A. Shewhart - control charts (1920s–1930s)
- Shigeo Shingo (1909–1990) - Zero Quality Control (Poka-Yoke) and Single Minute Exchange of Dies (SMED)
- Herbert A. Simon (1916–2001) - satisficing Nobel Prize, 1978
- Ibrahim Sirkeci
- Adrian Slywotzky - marketing strategy (1990s)
- Linda Smircich
- Adam Smith - economics, capitalism, free trade (1770s)
- Ivan Snehota (1946–2022), Italian organizational theorist
- Henk G. Sol
- Rolf Solli
- Thomas J. Stanley
- Andy Stefanovich
- Victor Hermann Stempf (1893–1946) - American accountant
- Joel Stern - economic value added (1980s)
- Rosemary Stewart - business theorist
- Antonio Strati
- Robert I. Sutton
- G. A. Swanson
- Richard A. Swanson
- William R. Synnott

== T ==
- Genichi Taguchi (1924–2012) - Taguchi methods, quality control
- Don Tapscott
- Frederick Winslow Taylor - scientific management, time and motion study (20th century)
- Sridhar Tayur
- David Teece
- Vern Terpstra
- Jacques Thomassen (born 1945) - Dutch organizational theorist
- C. Bertrand Thompson
- Alvin Toffler
- Thomas Thorburn (1913–2003) - Swedish Professor of Business Administration
- Jean-Marie Toulouse
- Phil Town
- Henry R. Towne - scientific management (1890s)
- John Tregoning - factory management (1890s)
- Jack Trout
- Josiah Tucker
- Bruce Tuckman - stages of team development
- Dominique Turpin

== U ==
- Yoichi Ueno
- Werner Ulrich
- Lyndall Urwick

== V ==
- Peter Vaill
- Andrew H. Van de Ven
- Jan Vanthienen
- Hal Varian
- Antoaneta Vassileva
- Henrik Virkkunen (1917–1963) - Finnish organizational theorist and professor of accounting
- Henk Volberda
- Victor Vroom

== W ==
- André de Waal
- Jean-Baptiste Waldner - computer-integrated manufacturing
- Alexandra Waluszewski (born 1956) - Swedish organizational theorist
- James Watt (1736–1819) - Industrial Revolution, division of labour, standard operating procedures, cost control (1810s)
- Max Weber - a founder of the modern study of sociology and public administration (1900)
- Frank E. Webner (1865–1940s) - American consulting cost accountant
- Karl E. Weick (1936–2026) - American organizational theorist
- Lawrence Welch (born 1945) - Australian organisational theorist
- Joseph Wharton (1826–1909) - protective tariffs, business cycles, Wharton School
- Alasdair A. K. White
- John Whitmore (c. 1870–1937) - American accountant, contributed to standard costing
- Eli Whitney (1765–1825) - interchangeable parts, cost accounting (1810s, 1820s)
- Jennifer Wilby
- Thomas Williams of Llanidan
- Oliver E. Williamson - transaction costs, theory of the firm (1960s)
- Mark W. Willis
- Pieter Winsemius
- Clinton Edgar Woods (1863–c. 1930) - factory organization (1900s)

== Y ==
- Candace A. Yano

== Z ==
- Udo Zander (born 1959) - Swedish organizational theorist

== See also ==
- List of economists
