= Vaill =

Vaill is a surname. Notable people with the surname include:

- Amanda Vaill, American writer and editor
- Peter Vaill, American academic
- Teresa Vaill (born 1962), American racewalker

== See also ==
- Dudley Vaill Talcott (1899–1896), American sculptor, author and illustrator
- Edward W. Vaill House, historic house in New Jersey, United States
- Vaill., taxonomic author abbreviation of Sébastien Vaillant (1669–1722), French botanist
