= Hein Schreuder =

Dutch economist (1951–2023)

Hein Schreuder (24 December 1951 – 28 May 2023) was a Dutch economist and business executive, executive vice-president corporate strategy & acquisitions at DSM and professor at the University of Maastricht, especially known for his work on "Economic approaches to organizations" with Sytse Douma and for his role in the (second) transformation of DSM.

== Biography ==
Born in Jakarta, Schreuder graduated in Business Economics in 1976 at the Erasmus University Rotterdam. In 1981 he obtained his Ph.D. at the Vrije Universiteit on his thesis "Maatschappelijke Verantwoordelijkheid en Maatschappelijke Berichtgeving van Ondernemingen" ("Corporate Social Responsibility and Corporate Social Reporting").

Schreuder started work in 1975 as a business researcher at the Netherlands Economic Institute. From 1976 to 1981 he worked as head of business economic research at the Economic and Social Institute of the Free University of Amsterdam, of which he was subsequently the director from 1981 to 1984. After a sabbatical at the University of Washington in Seattle he was appointed one of the first professors at the newly established Faculty of Economics at the University of Maastricht. In 1991 Schreuder went into business life when he was recruited by Royal DSM as member of the management team of the division Polymers. In 1994 he became deputy director of Corporate Planning & Development of DSM and in 1996 director. Schreuder had acted as corporate strategist of DSM for 15 years, most recently as executive vice-president corporate strategy & acquisitions (until 2012). He was labelled as the "Architect of the new DSM".

Schreuder was Fellow at the European Institute for Advanced Studies in Management (EIASM) and at the Netherlands Institute for Advanced Study (NIAS), visiting professor at the Harvard Business School as well as distinguished visiting professor at the China Europe International Business School (CEIBS). He was the director at the Vlerick Business School, chairman of the supervisory boards of Ecorys and LVO, chairman of United World College Maastricht as well as board Advisor and Coach. In 2016 he was invested as a Knight of the Order of Orange-Nassau.

Schreuder died on 28 May 2023, at the age of 71.

== Work ==
Schreuder published eight books and many articles in the fields of business economics, strategic management and (economic) organization theory. Recently, he published (with J.P. Jeannet) "From Coal to Biotech", a strategic perspective on the transformation of DSM from a commodity chemicals company to a Life Science & Materials Science company.

=== Economic Approaches to Organizations, 1991, 2017 ===
Schreuder's best-known book "Economic Approaches to Organizations" (with Sytse Douma) was first published in 1991 (6th edition in 2017) and is translated into six languages.

Schreuder and Douma believe, that "economics has an important contribution to make to the understanding of organizations." In their opinion "economic approaches to organization focus specially on the economic problem of optimal allocation of scarce resources." and "the economic contribution to our understanding of an organizational problem increases when the economic problem forms a greater part of the organizational problem that we are trying to understand." The book systemically compares markets and organizations as coordination mechanisms for conducting transactions. It covers the behavioral theory of the firm, game theory, agency theory, transaction cost economics, the economics of strategy, evolutionary approaches to organizations and complexity economics in a non-technical way. In the sixth edition (2017) the authors explain the impact of digitization on organizations and the business model of digital platforms (like Amazon, Airbnb, Uber). There is now also a separate chapter on Behavioral Economics.

=== From Coal to Biotech, 2015 ===
With Jean-Pierre Jeannet, Schreuder published "From Coal to Biotech: The transformation of DSM with business school support". The book provides a strategic perspective on the remarkable transformation of DSM, first from a coal mining company to a commodity chemicals company, then to a life sciences and materials sciences firm with a strong biotechnology focus. The authors use the concept of 'strategic learning cycles' to discuss how DSM achieved this double transformation in an evolutionary way. It also discusses the company traits that have contributed to its ability to adapt, grow and prosper. Renowned business schools such as IMD and Babson have accompanied the second transformation of DSM through their executive education programs. The book documents this support and draws lessons for long-term collaboration between companies and the business school world.

=== People, Planet, Profit and Purpose: from PhD to DSM Practice, 2022 ===
In this essay Schreuder takes the reader along his journey of the past 45 years seeking answers to the questions (a) what the role is of business in society, (b) which responsibility the business firm has and (c) how a corporation may account for the way it has discharged this responsibility. His journey started in the academic world with a PhD titled 'Corporate Social Responsibility and Corporate Social Reporting' in a quest for theoretically sound standpoints. These are the starting points of this essay. After 15 years in academia Schreuder's journey was continued for 20 years in the world of practice. He became responsible for corporate strategy at DSM, a large Dutch multinational. As such he was involved in formulating the specific answers that DSM has given to these questions in the course of two decades. During this time the answers have evolved and it is interesting to read how and why, because DSM is often regarded as a frontrunner in this respect. Schreuder's more recent perspective is that CSR / Do No Harm has become the minimum we expect of the business firm. A Net Positive or, preferably, a Max Positive societal contribution has become the new aspiration. To achieve this the firm has to clearly articulate its purpose and set in motion 'positive welfare spirals', using its capabilities to make the highest possible contribution to fulfill a societal need, alone or (preferably) in an ‘ecosystem’ in collaboration with other entities. Companies like DSM that are able to achieve this exemplify that it is possible to combine Doing Well with Doing Good. It is Schreuder's expectation that this will increasingly become the new societal norm(al).

== Publications ==
Schreuder authored an co-authored many publications. Books, a selection:

- 1980. Het financiële jaarverslag van ondernemingen: een onderzoek onder gebruikers (The corporate annual report: a user study). With Jan Klaassen. Leiden: Stenfert Kroese
- 1981. Maatschappelijke verantwoordelijkheid en maatschappelijke berichtgeving van ondernemingen (Corporate social responsibility and corporate social reporting). Leiden: Stenfert Kroese.
- 1982. De voorspelbaarheid van omzetten en winsten (The predictability of sales and earnings). With Jan Klaassen. Leiden: Stenfert Kroese.
- 1984. European contributions to accounting research: the achievements of the last decade. With Anthony Hopwood. Amsterdam: Vrije Universiteit Uitgeverij.
- 1985. Economische wetenschappen: eenheid in verscheidenheid? (Unity and diversity in the economic sciences). With Joan Muysken. Assen : Van Gorcum.
- 1991. Economic approaches to organizations. 5th edition (2012). With Sytse Douma. London: Prentice Hall
- 1993. Interdisciplinary perspectives on organization studies. With Siegwart Lindenberg. Oxford: Pergamon Press
- 2015. From coal to biotech: the transformation of DSM with business school support. With Jean-Pierre Jeannet. Heidelberg: Springer.
- 2017. Economic approaches to organizations. 6th edition (2017). With Sytse Douma. London: Pearson Education
