= Malmi =

Malmi may refer to:

== People ==
- Anne Malmi (born 1965), Finnish curler
- Jalmari Malmi (1893–1943), Finnish farmer and politician
- Teemu Malmi (born 1965), Finnish organizational theorist

== Places ==
- Malmi, Helsinki, a district in the city of Helsinki, Finland
  - Malmi railway station
- Malmi, Pyhtää, a village in the municipality of Pyhtää, Finland
