= Albert Humphrey =

Albert Humphrey may refer to:

- Al Humphrey (1886–1961), baseball player
- Albert S. Humphrey (1926–2005), US management consultant
