= John Whitmore =

John Whitmore may refer to:

- John Whitmore (accountant) (c. 1870–1937), American accountant
- John Whitmore (architect) (1893–1943), American architect
- John Whitmore (banker) (1750–1826), governor of the Bank of England
- John Whitmore (millwright) (1801-1872)
- John Whitmore (racing driver) (born 1937), author, performance coach and former British racing driver
- John Whitmore (surfer) (1929–2001), pioneered the sport of surfing in South Africa
