= Reijo Luostarinen =

Reijo Kalevi Luostarinen (26 December 1939 – 24 November 2017) was a Finnish organisational theorist, Professor of International Business at the Aalto University School of Business, and chairman of Biohit. He is known for his work on internationalization and International business operations.

== Life and work ==
Born in Kajaani, Luostarinen obtained his degrees at the Helsinki School of Economics, the Aalto University School of Business since 2010.

After graduation Luostarinen started his career as international business agent. He became Professor of International Marketing at the Helsinki School of Economics from 1983 to 2003, director of its International Trade Research Center, and its Vice-Rector from 1992 to 1996. He also lectured at the Helsinki University of Technology and at the University of Vaasa.

From 2003 to 2011 he Luostarinen was chairman of Biohit. He has also been President of the European International Business Academy (EIBA), Regional Chairman of Europe for the US International Business Academy, and international business expert in the various UN organizations and ministries. He served on the boards of several other companies.

He died on 24 November 2017 at the age of 77.

== Selected publications ==
- Welch, Lawrence S., and Reijo Luostarinen. Internationalization: evolution of a concept. Graduate School of Management, Monash University, 1988.
- Luostarinen, Reijo, and Lawrence Welch. International business operations. KY Book Store, 1990.
- Luostarinen, Reijo. Internationalization of the Firm. Helsingin kauppakorkeakoulu, 1994.

Articles, a selection:

- Welch, Lawrence S., and Reijo K. Luostarinen. "Inward-outward connections in internationalization." Journal of International Marketing (1993): 44–56.
- Korhonen, Heli, Reijo Luostarinen, and Lawrence Welch. "Internationalization of SMEs: Inward-outward patterns and government policy." MIR: Management International Review (1996): 315–329.
