= Peter Naudé =

British business theorist

- Born: September 1952 (age 74)
- Occupation: Academic
- Title: Professor

Academic background
- Education: Manchester Business School

Academic work
- Discipline: Marketing
- Sub-discipline: organisational theory
- Institutions: Manchester Business School
- Main interests: Business networks

Peter Naudé (born 1950s) is a British academic who is organisational theorist and Professor of Marketing at the Manchester Business School, known for his work on business networks.

== Life and work ==
Naudé obtained his Phd in Marketing 1992 at the Manchester Business School.

In the 1980s Naude had started his academic career at the University of Cape Town, where he taught at its Graduate School of Business until 1988, when he joined the University of Manchester for his graduate study. After his graduation he continued to lecture at the Manchester Business School until 1999. From 1999 to 2005 he was Professor of Marketing at the University of Bath School of Management and since 2005 he is Professor of Marketing back at the Manchester Business School.

Since the 1990s Naudé is affiliated with the North European Industrial Marketing and Purchasing Group.

== Selected publications ==
=== Books ===
- Naudé, Peter, and Peter W. Turnbull. Network dynamics in international marketing. Pergamon Press, 1998.

=== Articles ===
- Naudé, Pete, and Francis Buttle. "Assessing relationship quality." Industrial Marketing Management 29.4 (2000): 351–361.
- Berthon, P., Ewing, M., Pitt, L., & Naudé, P. (2003). Understanding B2B and the web: the acceleration of coordination and motivation. Industrial Marketing Management, 32(7), 553–561.
- Henneberg, Stephan C., Stefanos Mouzas, and Pete Naudé. "Network pictures: concepts and representations." European Journal of Marketing 40.3/4 (2006): 408–429.
