= Adrian Gostick =

British writer

- Born: 8 September 1965 (age 60); Burton upon Trent, United Kingdom
- Education: Seton Hall University
- Occupations: Author, speaker, consultant
- Known for: Employee engagement, Organizational culture
- Notable work: The Carrot Principle All In Leading with Gratitude Anxiety at Work
- Spouse: Jennifer Gostick
- Children: 1
- Website: Official website

Adrian Robert Gostick is a British writer. He writes on employee engagement and organizational culture. In 2011, he founded The Culture Works, a Utah-based consulting firm. Among his notable books are The Carrot Principle, All In, and The Orange Revolution, co-authored with Chester Elton.

== Early life ==
Gostick was born in Burton, England, the son of a Rolls-Royce draftsman father and a retail worker mother. In 1975, when he was 10 years old, his family emigrated to Canada. He served as an editor of the student paper at his Bachelor's Alma Mater.

== Publications ==
Gostick co-authored 10 books with Chester Elton including:

- Managing with Carrots: Using Recognition to Attract and Retain the Best People (2001) ISBN 1-58685-077-6
- The 24-Carrot Manager: A Remarkable Story of How a Leader Can Unleash Human Potential (2002) ISBN 1-58685-154-3
- A Carrot a Day: A Daily Dose of Recognition for Your Employees (2004) ISBN 1-58685-506-9
- The Invisible Employee: Realizing the Hidden Potential in Everyone (2006) ISBN 0-471-77739-0
- The Carrot Principle (Reissue, 2009) ISBN 1-4391-4917-8
- The Daily Carrot Principle: 365 Ways to Enhance Your Career and Life (2010) ISBN 1-4391-8173-X
- The Orange Revolution: How One Great Team can Transform an Entire Organization (2010) ISBN 1-4391-8245-0
- All In: How The Best Managers Create a Culture of Belief and Drive Big Results (2012) ISBN 978-1491511619
- What Motivates Me: Put Your Passions to Work (2014) ISBN 978-0996029704
- The Best Team Wins: The New Science of High Performance (2014) ISBN 978-1501179860
- Leading with Gratitude: Eight Leadership Practices for Extraordinary Business Results (2020) ISBN 978-0062965783
- Anxiety at Work: 8 Strategies to Help Teams Build Resilience, Handle Uncertainty, and Get Stuff Done (with Chester Elton, 2021) ISBN 978-0063046153
