= Karol Adamiecki =

Polish engineer, management researcher, and economist

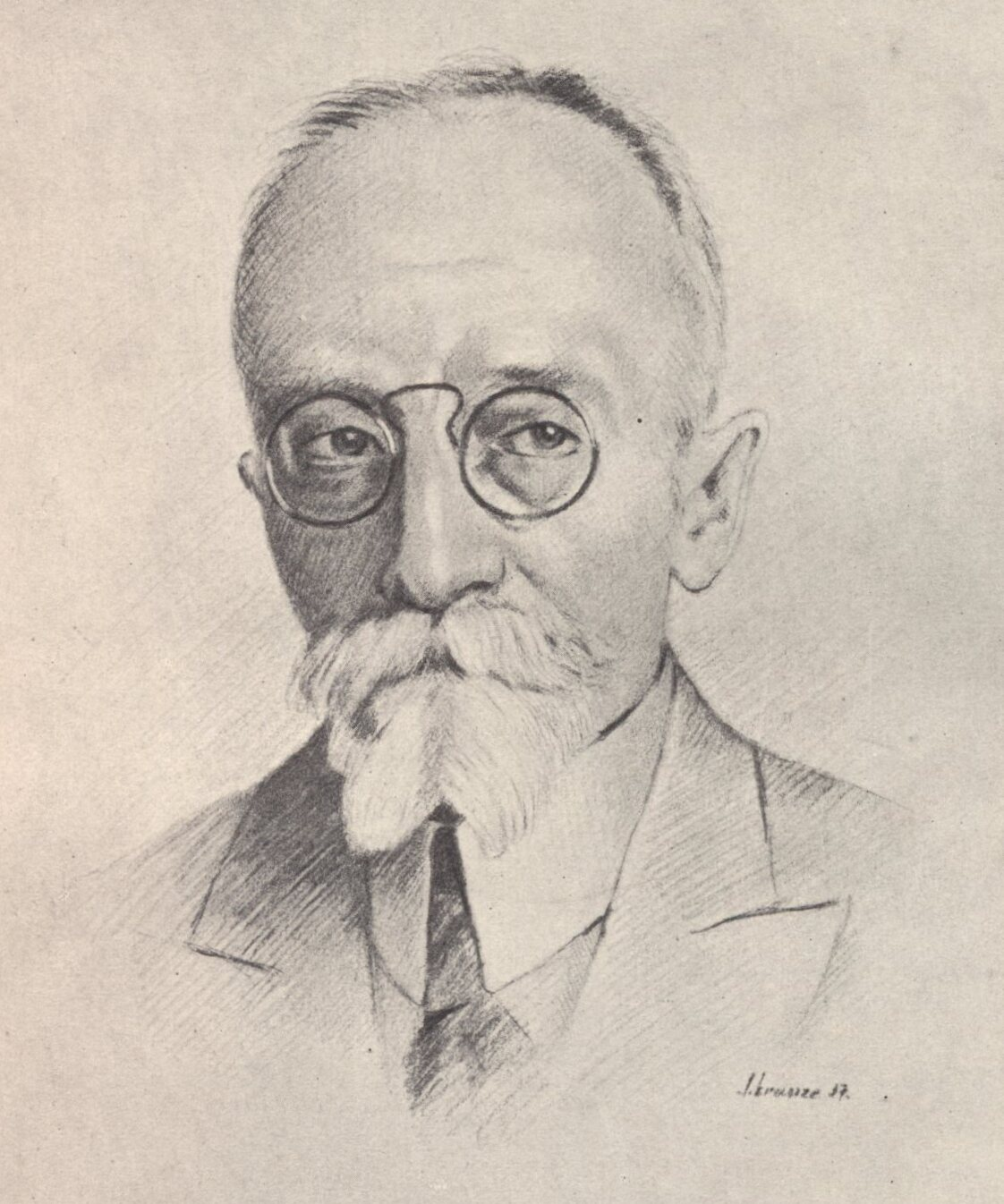
- Karol Adamiecki
- Born: 18 March 1866; Dąbrowa Górnicza, Poland
- Died: 16 May 1933 (aged 67); Warsaw, Poland
- Occupations: Academic, management researcher

Academic background
- Influences: Taylor; Le Chatelier

Academic work
- Discipline: Management studies
- School or tradition: Taylorism
- Notable ideas: Harmonogram

Karol Adamiecki (Dąbrowa Górnicza, 18 March 1866 – 16 May 1933, Warsaw, Poland) was a Polish engineer, management researcher, economist, and professor. He is known for developing the harmonogram, a bar graph displaying a project schedule, which is now more commonly referred to as the Gantt chart.

== Life ==
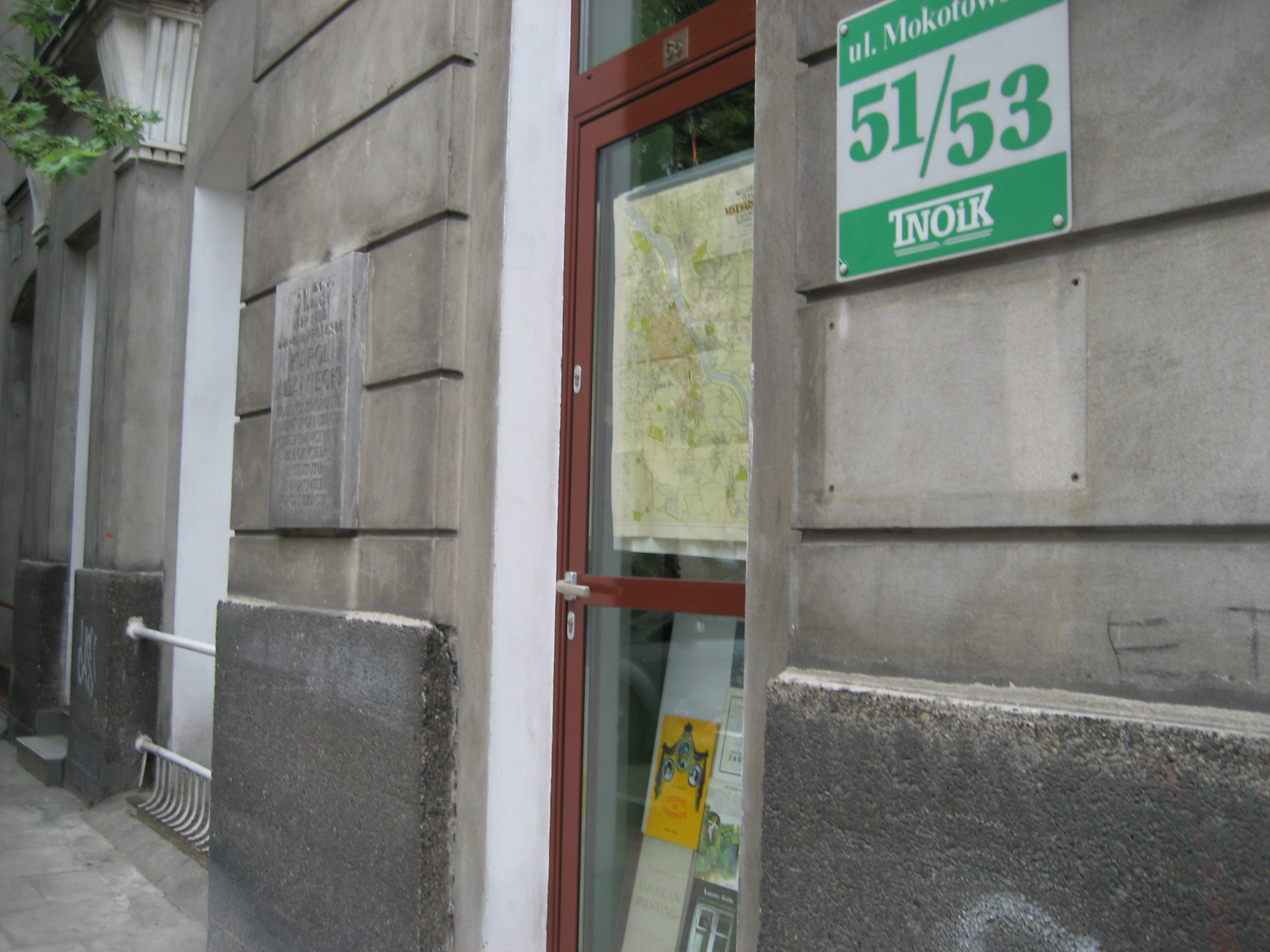
Ulica Mokotowska 51/53, Warsaw, site of Adamiecki's activities in 1927–1933

Karol Adamiecki was a prominent management researcher in Eastern and Central Europe. He began his research at the Institute of Technology in St. Petersburg, Russia (1884–1890). In 1891, he graduated in engineering from the university in St. Petersburg. He then returned to Dąbrowa Górnicza, where he was in charge of a steel rolling mill. While working in the steel industry, he developed his ideas on management.

In 1919, he joined the Warsaw Polytechnic as a lecturer, becoming a professor in 1922. From 1922, he headed the newly established Department of Work Organization and Industrial Enterprises at the Polytechnic's Faculty of Mechanical Engineering. He was the founder and first director (1925–1933) of the Institute of Scientific Organization (Instytut Naukowej Organizacji) in Warsaw. He served as vice president of the European Association of Scientific Management (Europejskie Stowarzyszenie Naukowego Zarządzania).

In 1896, Adamiecki invented a novel means of displaying interdependent processes so as to enhance the visibility of production schedules. In 1903, his theory caused a stir in Russian technical circles. He published some articles on it in the Polish magazine Przegląd Techniczny (Technical Review), nos. 17, 18, 19 and 20 (1909). In 1931, he published a more widely known article describing his diagram, which he called the harmonogram or harmonograf. Adamiecki had, however, published his works in Polish and Russian, languages little known in the English-speaking world. By this time, a similar method had been popularized in the West by Henry Gantt (who had published articles on it in 1910 and 1915). With minor modifications, Adamiecki's chart is now more commonly referred to in English as the Gantt chart.

Adamiecki published his first papers in management in 1898, before Frederick Winslow Taylor had popularized scientific management. In 1925 Adamiecki founded the Polish Institute of Scientific Management. He did most of his research and observations in the field of metallurgy.

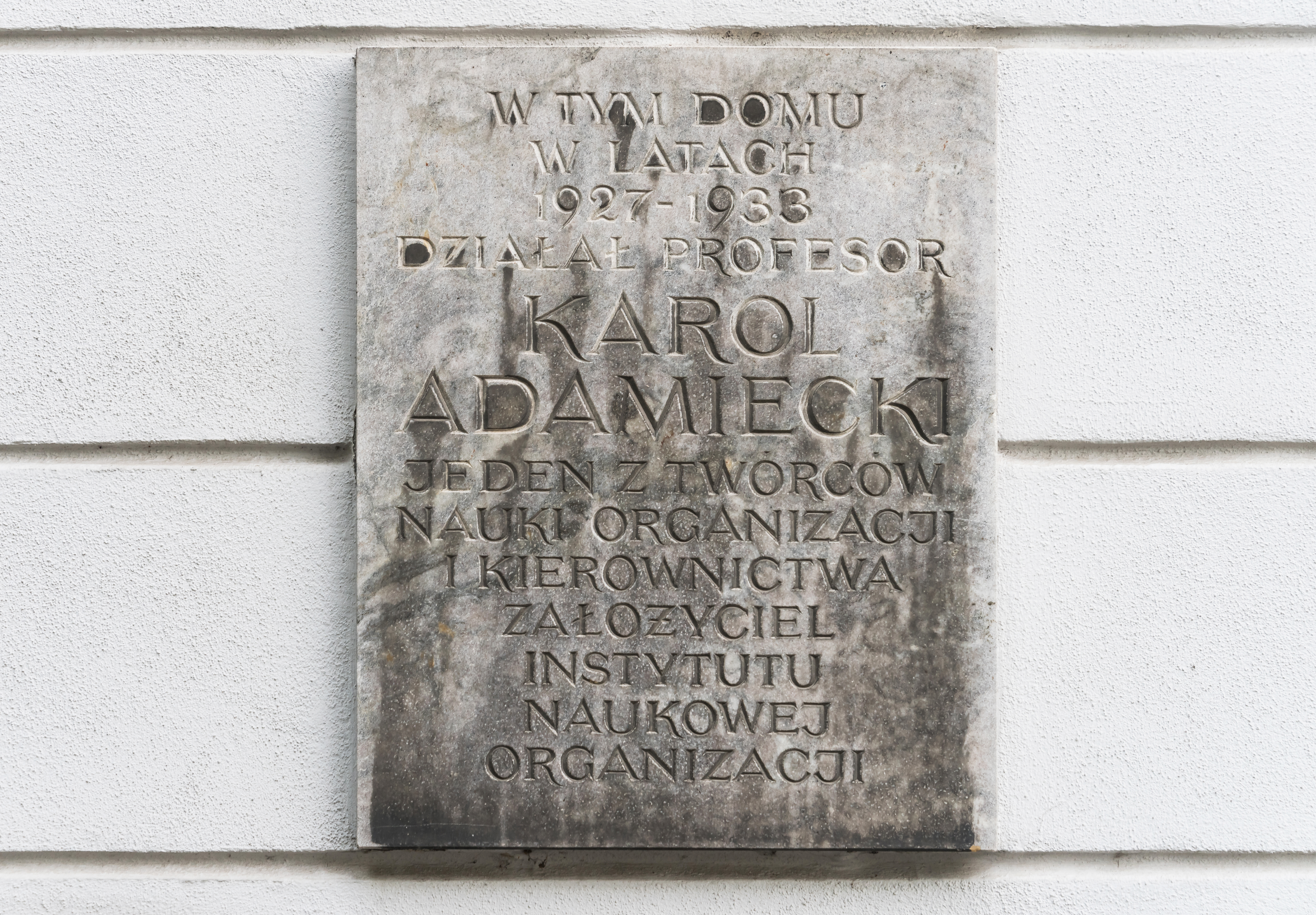
Plaque commemorating Adamiecki at ulica Mokotowska 51/53, Warsaw

He is the author of the "law of harmony in management" where he said harmony should comprise three parts:

- harmony of choice (all production tools should be mutually compatible, with special regard to their output production speed),
- harmony of doing (the importance of time coordination—schedules and timetables), and
- harmony of spirit (the importance of creating a good team).

In 1972, the State College of Economic Administration in Katowice was named after him, and in 1974 it became the Karol Adamiecki University of Economics (Akademia Ekonomiczna im. Karola Adamieckiego w Katowicach).

== See also ==
- List of business theorists
- List of economists
- List of Poles
