= Martela =

Finnish furniture company

Martela Oyj
- Type: Julkinen osakeyhtiö
- Traded as: Nasdaq Helsinki: MARAS
- Industry: Furniture
- Founded: 1945; 81 years ago in Helsinki, Finland
- Founder: Matti S. Martela
- Headquarters: Helsinki, Finland
- Key people: Johan Mild (Chairman of the Board); Ville Taipale (CEO); Henri Berg (CFO)
- Revenue: ▼86.7 million EUR (2024)
- Number of employees: 372 (2024)
- Website: www.martela.com

Martela Oyj is a Finnish company supplying furniture. In 2024, Martela Group's turnover was EUR 86.7 million and it employed an average of 372 employees.

Martela is the largest company in its sector in Finland and one of the three largest in the Nordic countries. In Finland, Martela offers a comprehensive service that can cover the entire process of change from initial inventory and design to removal and maintenance.

== History ==
Matti S. Martela worked at the Riihimäki woodworking company that he himself had founded. He had good relations to business circles and knew that there was demand for new office furniture. His idea was groundbreaking in its simplicity: create a company in Finland that would develop and market sensibly designed office furniture according to the new office standards.

Martela, then called Tehokaluste Oy, was established in 1945. Operations did not begin with production first, as with many competitors. Instead, the company focused on designing products and marketing them to customers. The founders of the company with business degrees were Matti S. Martela, Henrik Virkkunen, Unto Eskola and Jonne Jahnukainen, plus Svante Nurmiranta and interior architect Wladimir Rumjantsew.

Even before the company had been property established, Matti S. Martela had received orders for Tehokaluste from his future key client – the Finnish Government. He had offered the Director of the Resettlement Department of the Ministry of Agriculture, Veikko Vennamo, writing desks designed by interior architect Rumjantsew. Vennamo initially ordered fifty desks, but before the company had time even to deliver these, another order arrived for fifty more. A hundred desks was such a major order for the young company that it supported operations for the first months. The government continued to be Tehokaluste's biggest client throughout the 1940s. The first order began a healthy relationship with the Finnish Government's central procurement unit that lasted for decades.
