= Tim Ambler =

British organizational theorist

- Born: 1937
- Died: 3 August 2024 (aged 87)

Academic background
- Education: University of Oxford; Sloan School of Management

Timothy Felix John Ambler (1937– 3 August 2024) was a British organizational theorist, author, and academic specializing in Marketing effectiveness. Ambler was included in Marketing magazine’s list of the 100 most powerful figures in the industry, and the Chartered Institute of Marketing cited him among the world’s top 50 marketing experts.

== Life and career ==
Ambler was educated at Oxford University, where he earned an MA in mathematics, and at the MIT Sloan School of Management, where he completed an SM in marketing. Before entering academia, Ambler spent around 30 years in business, initially as an accountant, switching to marketing, and his knowledge of the two fields enabled him to develop new approaches to marketing effectiveness and accountability.

As marketing director for International Distillers and Vintners (IDV) he was associated with the development of Bailey's Irish Cream, Le Piat d'Or, Smirnoff Vodka and Croft Sherry. More recently he held overall international marketing responsibility for IDV and worked extensively in the US, Canada, Africa and emerging markets.

He was senior fellow and then honorary senior research fellow in marketing at London Business School and researched and written articles and books on Marketing effectiveness.

Since 2005, he was a senior fellow of the Adam Smith Institute, contributing research papers and over 200 blogs.

He died on 3 August 2024, aged 87, after a long illness.

== Key ideas ==
His books included Marketing and the Bottom Line (Prentice Hall, 2nd Edition 2003), Doing Business in China (with Morgen Witzel and Chao Xi, Routledge, 3rd Edition 2009) and The Lucky Marketeer (Quiller Press, 2014).

The British Chambers of Commerce published Ambler's report on deregulation, as well as co-authoring 10 annual reports on the cost of regulation to business and the weaknesses of government processes for new regulations.

The Adam Smith Institute published a series of Ambler's reports on Deregulation.

The Centre for Social Justice published Analysis Paralysis: Assess safeguarding children by results (May 2015).

The Worshipful Society of Marketers published Ambler's reports proposing a framework for Annual report narrative reporting, as a way of involving shareholders in marketing.

The Chartered Institute of Marketing published a report on Marketing Effectiveness to which Ambler was a principal adviser.

The Marketing Science Institute of America published the finding of Ambler's extensive research study of the use of marketing metrics in the UK and Spain. They subsequently published a study of Dashboards and Marketing.

The Australian Marketing Institute published Ambler's guidelines for choosing marketing dashboard metrics.

Ambler was editor and a contributor to the Special Issue on Marketing Metrics of the Journal of Marketing Management.

On retirement, he took up music composition, primarily for voice and wind. London Festivals of Contemporary Church Music have featured 11 of his works and his Mass has been performed at Westminster Cathedral, Downside Abbey and St John the Baptist Cathedral, Norwich

== See also ==
- Marketing Effectiveness
- Marketing Accountability
