= Lawrence Welch =

Lawrence S. Welch (born 1945) is an Australian organisational theorist, Professor of International Business at the Melbourne Business School, known for his work on internationalization and international business operations.

== Life and work ==
Welch obtained his Diploma of Education at the Newcastle University, his MCom and BCom at the University of New South Wales, and his PhD at the University of Queensland.

Welch has been appointed Professor of International Business at the Melbourne Business School. He is part of the editorial boards on the Journal of International Entrepreneurship, the Management International Review, and the International Business Review. journal. In 2011 he has been awarded the Hans B. Thorelli Award by the American Marketing Association.

Welch research interests are in the field of "foreign operation modes, internationalization, language and multinational management, export groups and export promotion."

== Selected publications ==
- Welch, Lawrence S., and Reijo Luostarinen. Internationalization: evolution of a concept. Graduate School of Management, Monash University, 1988.

Articles, a selection:

- Wiedersheim-Paul, Finn, Hans C. Olson, and Lawrence S. Welch. "Pre-export activity: The first step in internationalization." Journal of International Business Studies (1978): 47-58.
- Welch, Lawrence S., and Reijo K. Luostarinen. "Inward-outward connections in internationalization." Journal of International Marketing (1993): 44-56.
- Welch, Denice E., and Lawrence S. Welch. "The internationalization process and networks: a strategic management perspective." Journal of international marketing (1996): 11-28.
- Marschan-Piekkari, Rebecca, Denice Welch, and Lawrence Welch. "In the shadow: The impact of language on structure, power and communication in the multinational." International Business Review 8.4 (1999): 421-440.
