= Rolf Solli =

Swedish organizational theorist

- Born: 1953 (age 72–73)
- Occupations: Organizational theorist, Professor of Management
- Employer: University of Borås
- Known for: Research on management, leadership, and accounting in public sector organizations
- Title: Professor of Management

Academic work
- Notable works: Low-voiced control (1999); Organizing Metropolitan Space and Discourse (2001); Constructing Leadership (2006)

Rolf Solli (born 1953) is a Swedish organizational theorist and Professor of Management at the University of Borås. During 2003-2012 he was Director and Professor of Management Studies at GRI, Gothenburg Research Institute, Gothenburg School of Business, Economics and Law, Sweden.

His research focuses on processes of management, leadership and accounting mainly in the context of public sector organizations. He has published more than fifteen books, among which Low-voiced control. Perspective on civil finance officers in local government, (SNS, 1999), a volume edited with Barbara Czarniawska Organizing Metropolitan Space and Discourse, (Liber, 2001) and Constructing Leadership: Reflections on Film Heroes as Leaders with Björn Rombach (Santérus Academic Press, 2006).

Prior to his present position, Rolf Solli was for many years Head of School of Public Administration at University of Gothenburg.
