= Edward W. Vaill House =

Historic house in New Jersey, United States

- U.S. National Register of Historic Places
- New Jersey Register of Historic Places
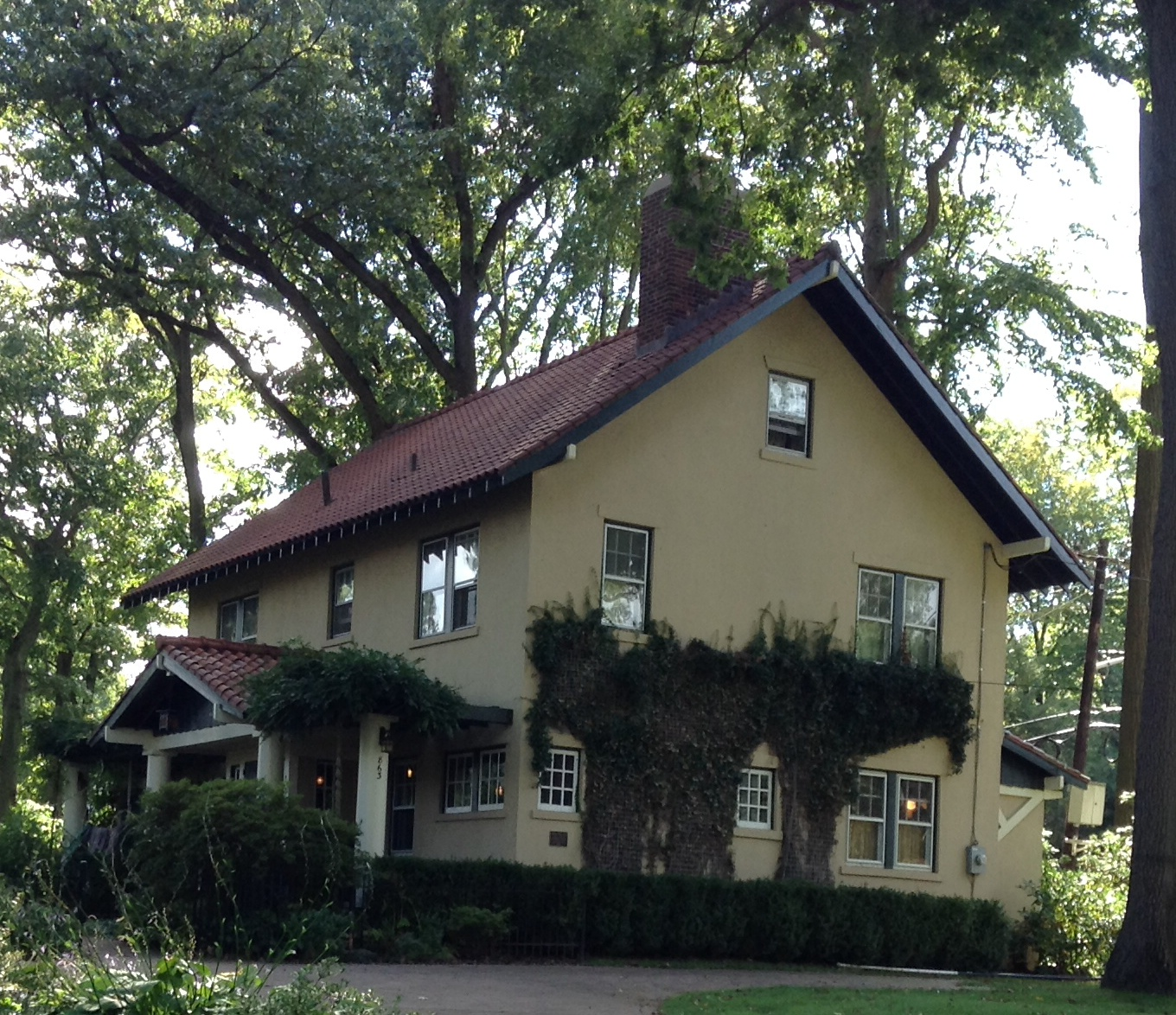

- Location within Bergen County, New Jersey Location within New Jersey Location within the United States
- Location: 863 Midland Road, Oradell, New Jersey
- Coordinates: 40°57′27″N 74°2′30″W
- Area: less than one acre
- Built: 1912
- Architects: Stickley, Gustav
- Architectural style: Bungalow/Craftsman
- NRHP reference No.: 89001595
- NJRHP No.: 614

Significant dates
- Added to NRHP: January 18, 1990
- Designated NJRHP: August 20, 1989

Edward W. Vaill House is located in Oradell, Bergen County, New Jersey, United States. The house was built in 1912 and was added to the National Register of Historic Places on January 18, 1990.

== See also ==
- National Register of Historic Places listings in Bergen County, New Jersey
