= Henrik Virkkunen =

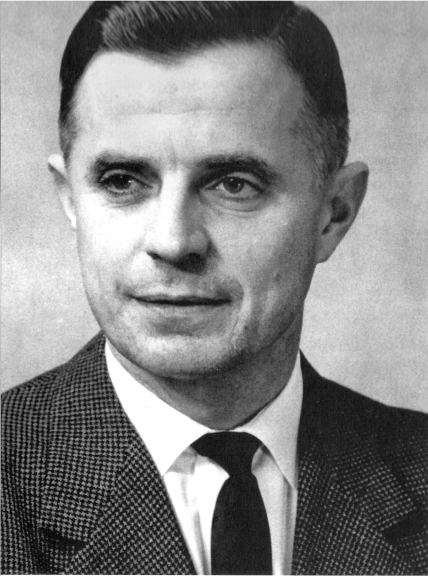
Henrik Virkkunen.

Johan Henrik Virkkunen (30 June 1917 – 7 March 1963) was a Finnish organizational theorist and Professor of Accounting at the Helsinki School of Economics, whose 1954 textbook Laskentatoimijohdon apuna (Accounting as a Tool of Management) influenced Finnish accountancy thinking for decades.

Virkkunen obtained his Ph.D. at the Helsinki School of Economics with the thesis, entitled Teollisuuden laskentatoimi (Industrial accountancy). He was Professor of Accounting at the Helsinki School of Economics from 1955 to 1963 beside Martti Saario, and its dean from 1961 to 1963. Virkkunen is also known for co-founding with Matti S. Martela and others Martela, a Finnish company supplying furniture and interior solutions.

Virkkunen's main work Laskentatoimijohdon apuna (Accounting as a Tool of Management) from 1954 was translated into German in 1956. In the work he expressed the view that "accounting is a management tool without any right to an existence of its own." Accounting needed to supply the input for management functions as planning and control.

== Selected publications ==
- Virkkunen, Henrik. Teollisuuden laskentatoimi, 1945 (Pentti Vuorenjuuren kanssa)
- Virkkunen, Henrik. Teollisuuden kertakustannukset, 1951
- Virkkunen, Henrik. Laskentatoimi johdon apuna, 1954
- Virkkunen, Henrik. Das rechnungswesen im Dienste der Leitung: systematisch-theoretische Untersuchung der Bereiche, Zweige und Aufgaben des Rechnungswesens unter besonderer Beachtung der Leitungsfunktionen. Vol. 21. Betriebswirtschaftswissenschaftlichen Institut zu Helsinki, 1956.
- Virkkunen, Henrik. Teollisen kustannuslaskennan perusteet ja hyväksikäyttö: Harjoitustehtäviä. Kauppakorkeakoulu, 1967.

Articles, a selection:

- Virkkunen, Henrik. "Laskentatoimi johdon apuna." Systemaattis-teoreettinen tutkimus teollisuusyrityksen laskentatoimen haaroista ja tehtävistä erityisesti johtotehtävien kannalta. Liiketaloudellisen Tutkimuslaitoksen julkaisuja 18 (1954).
