= Mark W. Willis =

American business executive

Mark Willis
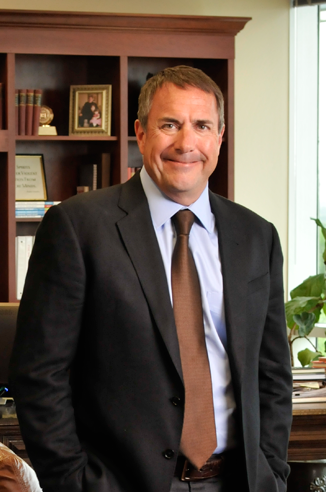
- Born: Mark W. Willis
- Occupation: Business executive
- Known for: Leadership
- Awards: Top 200 Most Powerful People in Real Estate

Mark Willis is an American business executive and stock holder at Keller Williams Realty, an international real estate franchise with headquarters in Austin, Texas. Willis was President of Keller Williams Realty prior to 2005 when he took over the position as chief executive officer (CEO). In 2015, Chris Heller succeeded Mark Willis as CEO.

== Career ==
Willis began his executive career in real estate in the mid-1980s as a branch manager for Coldwell Banker. He was also the proprietor of Carriage House Realty prior to joining Keller Williams Realty in 1991. Willis worked as a team leader in the firm's Southwest market center in Austin where he quadrupled the office's production over a five-year period. The market center became the number one real estate office within the organization during his time there. Willis was promoted to regional director for Central and South Texas where he expanded the region's presence in both San Antonio and Houston. It was during his time leading that region that he built a 1,900 agent business and earned a place in the REAL Trends' Billionaire's Club. In 2002, he was promoted to President of Keller Williams International.

Willis took over the position of CEO in 2005. Under his leadership, Keller Williams has become the largest real estate franchise by agent count in North America and exceeded 100,000 agents worldwide in 2014. In his position as CEO, Willis has been quoted in publications such as Training Magazine, which named Keller Williams the number two training organization across all industries and The New York Times. In 2013 he was named one of the 100 Most Influential Leaders by Inman News and in 2014 he was named as one of the 10 Most Powerful People in Residential Real Estate according to the Swanepoel Power 200. Co-founder Gary Keller announced an executive leadership transition on Feb. 9, 2015, with Chris Heller succeeding Mark Willis as CEO.

== See also ==
- List of real estate topics
- Real estate economics
