= Robert Dahlstrom =

- Born: c. 1958 (age 67–68)

Academic background
- Education: Xavier University (BBA); University of Cincinnati (PhD)

Academic work
- Discipline: Marketing
- Sub-discipline: International marketing Green marketing
- Institutions: University of Kentucky; BI Norwegian Business School; Farmer School of Business

Robert F. Dahlstrom (born c. 1958) is an American organizational theorist who is the Seibert Professor in the Miami University Department of Marketing. known for his work on international marketing.

== Education ==
Dahlstrom obtained a Bachelor of Business Administration from Xavier University in 1980 and a PhD in marketing at the University of Cincinnati in 1990.

== Career ==
Dahlstrom started his academic career at the University of Kentucky in 1990, where he became Bloomfield Professor of Marketing at the Gatton College of Business and Economics. He founded and directed its Douglas K. Von Allmen Center for Green Marketing, which aims "to expand the knowledge of green marketing practices among business owners, and to contribute to scholarly research on green marketing and sustainability." From 2000 to 2014 Dahlstrom was professor at the BI Norwegian Business School and the Joseph C. Seibert Professor of Marketing at the Farmer School of Business.

== Selected publications ==
- Dahlstrom, Robert. Green marketing management. Cengage Learning, 2010.
- Lagace, Rosemary R., Robert Dahlstrom, and Jule B. Gassenheimer. "The relevance of ethical salesperson behavior on relationship quality: The pharmaceutical industry." Journal of Personal Selling & Sales Management 11.4 (1991): 39–47.
- Dahlstrom, Robert, and Arne Nygaard. "An exploratory investigation of interpersonal trust in new and mature market economies." Journal of Retailing 71.4 (1996): 339–361.
- Ayers, Doug, Robert Dahlstrom, and Steven J. Skinner. "An exploratory investigation of organizational antecedents to new product success." Journal of Marketing Research (1997): 107–116.
- Dahlstrom, Robert, and Arne Nygaard. "An empirical investigation of ex post transaction costs in franchised distribution channel s." Journal of marketing Research (1999): 160–170.
- Flaherty, Theresa B., Robert Dahlstrom, and Steven J. Skinner. "Organizational values and role stress as determinants of customer-oriented selling performance." Journal of Personal Selling & Sales Management 19.2 (1999): 1–18.
