= Netherlands Economic Institute =

The Netherlands Economic Institute (NEI) is a research institute based in Rotterdam.

== History ==
=== 1929–1940 ===
The NEI was established in 1929 by a group of businessmen from Rotterdam. Its initial purpose was to collect economic data and to analyze economic problems. It published its research in its own journal Economische Statistische Berichten (ESB). Over the years it added economic consultancy. Before the second World War it remained relatively small with about 20 employees.

=== 1945–1990 ===
NEI was affiliated with the Erasmus University Rotterdam. One of its directors was professor Jan Tinbergen, who won the first Nobel prize in Economics in 1969. Through his influence NEI became a strong player in development economics. Another director, professor Klaassen, stimulated growth in the field of spatial economics. Later, professor Molle led the NEI to prominence in the field of European integration. Through such expansions and diversifications NEI grew and internationalized significantly. In 1970 it had about 80 employees.

=== 1990–1999 ===
Together with six other European research and consultancy companies NEI founded ERECO, the European Economic Research and Advisory Consortium.

In 1999 NEI was split into a company for research & consultancy and a foundation with the aim to foster economic research. Thereafter NEI merges with Kolpron, a Dutch consulting company in real estate.

== Ecorys ==
In 2000 NEI Kolpron merged with the UK company ECOTEC Research & Consulting, established in 1982. The new organisation was called Ecorys. It has offices in many European countries and also in Turkey, Ghana, Bangladesh and India. In 2002 NEI transferred all activities to Ecorys and continues as its major shareholder, holding more than 40 percent of Ecorys shares in the foundation.
