= Ecorys =

Ecorys is one of the oldest economic research and consulting companies in Europe. Its history dates back to 1929, when a group of businessmen from Rotterdam established the Foundation, Netherlands Economic Institute (NEI). The goal of NEI was to stimulate the collection and the analysis of economic data. One of its first directors (1935-1968) was Professor Jan Tinbergen, who was awarded the first Nobel Prize for Economics for his work in 1969. In 1999, NEI was split into a company, focusing on economic research & consultancy, and a foundation with the aim to foster economic research. The company merged with Kolpron Consultants (established in 1979).

In 2000 Ecorys was created through the merger of the Dutch company NEI Kolpron with ECOTEC Research and Consulting, a UK-based company specializing in social and environmental policy, founded by Frank Joyce and Hugh Williams OBE. ECOTEC had several hundred employees in multiple offices across Europe and extensive contracts with regional, national and international governments. Ecorys internationalized further and today has offices in many European countries as well as in India. It has close to 500 employees.

== Sectors ==
- Social Policy
- Regions and Cities
- Transport and infrastructure
- Security and Justice
- Natural Resources
- Economic Growth
- Public Sector Reform

== Offices ==
Ecorys has offices all around the world.

=== Europe ===
- Rotterdam (head office)
- Amsterdam
- London
- Birmingham
- Leeds
- Brussels
- Warsaw
- Madrid
- Zagreb
- Sofia
- Rome

=== Asia ===
- Ankara
- Delhi
- Bangladesh

=== Africa ===
- Lusaka
- Ghana
- Tanzania
- Zimbabwe
