= Martti Saario =

Martti Saario (1906 - 1988) was a Finnish economist and professor of accounting at the Helsinki School of Economics, known for his development of the Finnish expenditure-revenue theory.

Saario obtained his PhD at the Helsinki School of Economics in 1945 with a thesis on the "Realisointiperiaate ja käyttöomaisuuden poistot tuloslaskennassa" (The realization principle and depreciation of fixed assets in measurement of net income). He served as a professor of accounting at the Helsinki School from 1948 until his retirement in 1971. While he focussed on financial accounting (bookkeeping, company income taxation, auditing), another professor of accounting at the same school, Henrik Virkkunen, focussed on management accounting.

Saario developed an expenditure-revenue theory, which offered "a dynamic profit calculation theory of accounting... [which] strongly influenced Finnish accounting thought, legislation, and practice until the mid-1990s." In retrospect, the key principles in Saario’s theory (1945) were consistent with those in the famous Paton and Littleton monograph An Introduction to Corporate Accounting Standards which was published a few years earlier (1940). These principles include the use of: (1) historical costs as the basis of accounting, (2) the so-called accruals basis in recognizing revenues and expenses, and (3) matching expenses with the revenues they have earned in the calculation of period’s net income. Noteworthily, the name of Saario's theory ("expenditure - revenue theory") derived directly from the last mentioned matching principle.

== Selected publications ==
- Saario, Martti. Realisointiperiaate ja käyttöomaisuuden poistot tuloslaskennassa. PhD Thesis, Helsinki School of Economics, 1945.
- Saario, Martti. Kirjanpidon meno-tulo-teoria. Otava, 1959.

Articles, a selection:

- Saario, Martti. "On Expenditure Tax Shield." Enterprise Income, Financing and Taxation II (in Finnish). Ed. by Martti Saario. Helsinki (1969).
- Saario, Martti. "The Present Value and Proper Timing of Depreciations." Enterprise Income, Financing and Taxation II (in Finnish). Ed. by Martti Saario. Helsinki (1969).

About Saario:

- Pihlanto, Pekka, and Kari Lukka. "Martti Saario–suomalaisen laskenta-ajattelun kehittäjä." The Finnish Journal of Business Economics 3 (1993): 251–277.
- Lukka, K., and P. Pihlanto. "Martti Saario (1906–88). The developer of Finnish accounting theory." Twentieth-century accounting thinkers. Routledge (1994).
- Pajunen, Kati. "Martti saario–Henkilökuva." LTA 4 (2011): 11.
