= Antonio Strati =

Antonio Strati (born 1949) is an Italian organizational theorist, artist and Professor at the University of Trento, particularly known for his work on "Organization and aesthetics".

== Biography ==
Born in Reggio Calabria, Italy, Strati attended secondary education in Florence. He received his BA in sociology in 1974 from the University of Trento. In 1982 he received his PhD in Organization Studies in 1982 from the Tavistock Institute in London, where he specialized in Action Research.

After his graduation he started at the University of Trento, where he was coordinated the teaching programme on qualitative methods in social research. He also directed the master's degree in Work, Organization and Information, and was vice-dean of the Faculty of Sociology. Eventually he was appointed Full professor at the Faculty of Sociology of the University of Trento. Strati also lectured "A Photographic Look at Work and Organization" at Sciences Po in Paris.

== Selected publications ==
Books:

- Strati, Antonio. Organization and aesthetics. Sage, 1999.
- Strati, Antonio. Theory and method in organization studies: paradigms and choices. Sage, 2000.

Articles, a selection:

- Strati, Antonio. "Aesthetic understanding of organizational life." Academy of Management Review 17.3 (1992): 568–581.
- Strati, Antonio. "La grounded theory." in: L. Ricolfi (ed,). La ricerca qualitativa, La Nuova Italia Scientifica, Roma (1997).
- Strati, Antonio. "The aesthetic approach in organization studies." The aesthetics of organization (2000): 13–34.
