= Arne Nygaard =

Norwegian organizational theorist (born 1957)

Arne Nygaard (born 17 May 1957) is a Norwegian organizational theorist best known for his work with Robert Dahlstrom on transaction costs in franchising.

== Biography ==
Nygaard obtained his Master of Business and Economics (MBE) at the BI Norwegian Business School in 1982, his Master of Science at the Norwegian School of Economics and Business Administration, where he also obtained his PhD in 1992.

Nygaard started his career as Executive Officer Petroleum office in the Norwegian State Audit Commission in 1983. in 1985 he moved to the Institute of Energy- and Industrial Policy at the BI Norwegian Business School, where he was started as research assistant, and became research scholar in 1987. In 1990 he became Research Fellow at the Norwegian Institute for Research in Marketing, in 1994 Associate Professor, since 2000 Full Professor.

== Selected publications ==
- Midttun, A., Nordeng, Ø. and Nygaard, A., Utenlandske investeringer i norsk industri – bør de hemmes eller fremmes?, Oslo: Tano, 1987.
- Arne Nygaard. Measuring Transaction Costs in Plural Formed Marketing Channels. VDM Publishing, 2009.

Articles, a selection:

- Dahlstrom, Robert, and Arne Nygaard. "An exploratory investigation of interpersonal trust in new and mature market economies." Journal of Retailing 71.4 (1996): 339-361.
- Dahlstrom, Robert, and Arne Nygaard. "An empirical investigation of ex post transaction costs in franchised distribution channel s." Journal of marketing Research (1999): 160-170.
- Nygaard, Arne, and Robert Dahlstrom. "Role stress and effectiveness in horizontal alliances." Journal of Marketing 66.2 (2002): 61-82.
- Haugland, Sven A., Ingunn Myrtveit, and Arne Nygaard. "Market orientation and performance in the service industry: A data envelopment analysis." Journal of Business Research 60.11 (2007): 1191-1197.
