= Seena Sharp =

Seena Sharp, author of Competitive Intelligence Advantage, is a recognized leader in Competitive Intelligence. She founded one of the first competitive intelligence companies, Sharp Market Intelligence, in Los Angeles, United States in 1979, a company that serves clients across the US, Canada, Europe, Asia, and Africa.

Seena had a successful corporate career in New York City, where she earned her master's degree in mathematics. Her research, speaking and conference activities focus on various aspects of market and competitive intelligence, including market drivers, keys to success, alternative uses, unknown customers, emerging competitors, competitor profiles, external factors, and opportunities.

Ms. Sharp’s work has been published, and she has spoken to organizations and universities in the United States and Europe. She received SCIP’s Fellows Award. Her monthly SharpInsights features her approaches to identifying growth opportunities and market changes.

== Articles and Publications ==
- 2014, Sharp, S "Shake Up Your Thinking, Shape Up Your Business: 68 SharpInsights to Attract Customers and Boost Sales", ISBN 978-1-312-14068-4
- 2013, Sharp, S. "SharpInsights: Your Little Black Book of Market Revelations", ISBN 978-1304353108
- 2009, Sharp, S. Competitive Intelligence Advantage: How to Minimize Risk, Avoid Surprises, and Grow Your Business in a Changing World, (Wiley and Sons) ISBN 978-0-470-29317-1
- 2005, Frates, J., Sharp, S. Using Business Intelligence to Discover New Market Opportunities, (Journal of Competitive Intelligence and Management), 3(3), p. 16
- 2004, Sharp, S. Build Better Decisions: Strategies for Reducing Risk and Avoiding Surprises, (Handbook of Business Strategy, Emerald Publishing Group Limited)
- 2000, Sharp, S. Truth or Consequences: 10 Myths that Cripple Competitive Intelligence, (Competitive Intelligence Magazine), 3(1)
- 2000, Sharp, S. Tracking Change in Unusual Ways, (Marketing News, A Publication of the American Marketing Association), 34(11)
- 1998, Sharp, S. Substitutes: Your Next Marketing Headache, (Competitive Intelligence Magazine), 1(1)
- 1994, Sharp, S. Tomorrow's Competitive Intelligence: A Whole New Board Game, (Director's Monthly), 18(5)
- 1994, Sharp, S. Information for Sale, (Home Office Computing)
- 1993, Sharp, S. Soft Information as Important as Hard Facts in Making Business Decisions, (The Planning Forum Network), 6(8)
