= Peter Vaill =

American academic

Peter Brown Vaill (November 5, 1936 – March 24, 2020) was an organizational change theorist who published widely in the fields of organizational behavior, organization development (O.D.), and leadership studies, including the intersection of spirituality and leadership.

== Life ==
Dr. Peter Vaill

Vaill was born in St. Cloud, Minnesota, on November 5, 1936, to Stanley and Elizabeth (Brown) Vaill. Peter's father, who worked for the phone company, was transferred from St. Cloud to Duluth for nine years, then later to Minneapolis. Peter attended high school in Minneapolis and earned an undergraduate degree in Psychology from the University of Minnesota. In 1958, he entered Harvard Business School, and graduated in 1960 a with degree in General Management. In 1964 he received a Doctorate in Business Administration from Harvard Business School with field of study in Organizational Behavior.

In 2001, Vaill was paralyzed from the waist down. He died on March 24, 2020, in a hospital in Minneapolis due to complications from pneumonia.

=== Professorships and works ===
Vaill is known for his innovative approaches to organizational behavior. His books include Managing as a Performing Art: New Ideas for a World of Chaotic Change, Learning as a Way of Being: Strategies for Survival in a World of Permanent White Water, and Spirited Leading and Learning: Process Wisdom for a New Age.

In the final months of his life, Vaill co-hosted a podcast with Dave Fearon called "Choosing a Practiced Way of Life".

== See also ==
- Eric Dent
