= Vincent Mangematin =

French researcher and professor

- Born: 1965 (age 60–61); France
- Awards: IAMOT Top 50 Researchers Award (2008)

Academic background
- Education: ENS Cachan; Paris Dauphine University
- Thesis: Recherche coopérative et stratégie de normalisation (1993)

Academic work
- Discipline: Management, Strategic management
- Sub-discipline: Innovation management, Technology management
- Institutions: Grenoble Ecole de Management; INRA
- Main interests: Technology transfer; high-tech startups; clusters; business models
- Website: www.grenoble-em.com/annuaire/vincent-mangematin

Vincent Mangematin (born 1965) is a French researcher and professor in management, specialized in Strategy, Strategic management of Innovation and Technology Management. He is currently professor and scientific director at Grenoble Ecole de Management.

== Biography ==
Mangematin received his PhD in Administrative Sciences from Université Paris IX Dauphine in 1993 and is an ENS Cachan alumni. His thesis, entitled « Recherche coopérative et stratégie de normalisation » focuses on technological competition processes.

He has worked for INRA Grenoble as member of the scientific board of the department of economics. His research concerns procedures for the transfer of technology between education and industry. In 2000, he was dean of INRA, before joining Grenoble Ecole de Management. He has been a senior professor and scientific director since 2010 at GEM.

He has been an invited professor in many universities (Université du Québec, Georgia Institute of Technology, Chalmers University, Cass Business School) and in ESSEC Business School, he is also an associate professor in Dublin Institute of Technology.

== Work ==
Mangematin’s main research areas are strategic management of innovation, role of user communities in the innovation processes, the globalization of business education and the institutionalization processes in emerging and changing environments.

=== Presentation ===
Mangematin’s research interest focuses on innovation processes in technological competition situations. He has successively worked on technology transfer, especially individuals’ movement between organisations and technology platforms, on creation and growth of high-tech startups, on clusters’ influence and on new business models emergence. His theorical perspectives are related to two key pillars : on the one hand, renewal of strategical approaches thanks to the business model concept, and on the other hand, roles of visibility, recognition and reputation within knowledge economy, especially in art fields (architecture), in scientific research and in business schools.

Mangematin also analyses in his work the conditions of change of the innovation dynamics in different industries: nanotechnology, biotechnology, cultural industry and business education.

Mangematin received a publication award in 2008 from the IAMOT (International Association for Management of Technology), making him one of the top 50 authors of technology and innovation management over the last five years, based on quantitative analysis of research from 2003 and 2007.

=== Creation and circulation of knowledge ===
Mangematin explored various strategies of knowledge creation and transmission within and amongst knowledge-based organisations. From the example of biotechnologies and nanotechnologies, he worked on firms evolution within nascent industries. He concentrated on the following topics : knowledge integration within project-based firms along the industry life cycle, coupling between financial and scientific resources within high tech companies, spatial organisation of economic, technological and scientific activities in emerging sectors where sharing of research facilities is required.

Mangematin has been researching the underlying ambiguous roles of scientific and human capital in high tech organization. His research regarding geography of innovation showed that :

- Clusters foster the creation of firms but not their growth
- Cluster policy based on growth generates diseconomies of scale, higher competition amongst local actors and high pressure on resources.
- Cluster policies based on eliteness and visibility are successful
- Governance matters

In close cooperation with Esther Tippmann and Pamela Sharkey-Scott, he has also been analysing the construction and circulation of knowledge by middle managers in multinational firms

=== Technology transfer and management of public research organisms ===
Technology transfer strategies essentially lie in research alliances or patent and licensing but Mangematin focuses on alternative means of technology transfer like mobility of human resources from academia to industry or firm creation. His research is especially based on individual as central technology transfer mechanisms, especially mid career around 40–50 years old researcher. He also focuses on management of shared research facilities as a mode of technology transfer.

== Selected publications ==
Articles, a selection:

- Mangematin, Vincent, and Lionel Nesta. "What kind of knowledge can a firm absorb?." International Journal of Technology Management 18.3 (1999): 149-172.
- Mangematin, Vincent. "PhD job market: professional trajectories and incentives during the PhD." Research policy 29.6 (2000): 741-756.
- Mangematin, V., Lemarié, S., Boissin, J. P., Catherine, D., Corolleur, F., Coronini, R., & Trommetter, M. (2003). "Development of SMEs and heterogeneity of trajectories: the case of biotechnology in France." Research Policy, 32(4), 621-638.
