= Francis Buttle =

British Professor (retired)

Francis Buttle is a retired Professor of Customer Relationship Management (CRM), Management, Relationship Marketing, and Marketing, and a customer management consultant based. He is author of more than 160 peer-reviewed scientific papers and 16 books which have been cited over 20,000 times earning him an h-index of 51.

Buttle was born in the UK in 1948, and educated at Lancaster Royal Grammar School. He later earned degrees from the University of Manchester Institute of Science and Technology (B.Sc. Hons), University of Lancaster (M.A.) and the University of Massachusetts (Ph.D.). He worked in a number of private sector roles before becoming a university academic. He taught and researched at the University of West of England (at that time named Bristol Polytechnic), Massey University (New Zealand), University of Surrey (UK), University of Massachusetts (USA), Manchester Business School (UK) and Macquarie Graduate School of Management (Australia). His research interests ranged across services marketing, CRM, hospitality marketing, service quality, business-to-business relationships, word-of-mouth, complaints management and merchandising. Buttle is probably best known for his development of the discipline of "Customer Relationship Management" (CRM), a strategic business practice that aims to build and maintain long-term mutually beneficial relationships with customers or other stakeholders. Buttle has researched, taught and consulted widely on CRM, marketing and customer service. He was the world's first full university professor of CRM.

Buttle taught CRM and related subjects in universities on three different continents. He was appointed to a sponsored chair in CRM at Manchester Business School in the UK. Buttle has a love of music and has written songs, played guitar and sung in a number of rock and blues-oriented bands. Buttle currently lives in Sydney, Australia, providing consulting, management development and mentoring services to for-profit and not-for-profit organisations.
