= Stephen G. Haines =

Stephen G. Haines (1945–2012) was an American organizational theorist, management consultant, author of books on management and systems thinking.

== Biography ==
Stephen Haines earned a B.S. in engineering from the United States Naval Academy. He also worked for a doctorate in Management and Educational Psychology from Temple University, but did not complete the dissertation He received a Master of Science in Administration in Organization Development under Richard F. Ericson and Jerry Harvey at the George Washington University.

As a former U.S. Naval officer, he flew Navy jets, piloted ships, and served off Vietnam. In the 1970s, Haines worked as an executive and consultant. He was executive vice president of Imperial Corporation of America, a nationwide financial services firm that filed for bankruptcy in 1990. and senior vice president of Freddie Mac. He also held executive positions with MCI Inc., Exxon, Sunoco, and Marriott Corporation. In the 1980s, he was president of University Associates (UA) Consulting and Training Services. He founded the Haines Centre for Strategic Management in 1990, and was CEO; the firm now has a network of offices in over 25 countries. He was active in the formulation of the Association for Strategic Planning's strategic planning certification program.

Haines died in San Diego, California on July 2, 2012.

== Work ==
=== Strategic Management System ===
To develop a strategic management system, Haines (2000) suggested using the "Systems Thinking Approach" and its five-phased (ABCDE) Systems Thinking model that invites the leader to ask and answer five important questions:

(A) Where do we want to be?
(B) How will we know when we get there?
(C) Where are we right now?
(D) How do we get there from here?, and
(E) What is changing in the future external environment, that we need to take into account?

These five questions "align directly with the five phases of a system: (1) output, (2) feedback loop, (3) input, and (4) throughput/actions (5) within the dynamic and changing environment".

== Publications ==
Haines wrote more than 16 books, over 50 articles, and developed 12 volumes of the Haines' Strategic Library. A selection:

- 1995. Sustaining High Performance:The Strategic Transformation to a Customer Focused Learning Organization, with Katie McCoy
- 1998. Manager's Pocket Guide to Strategic and Business Planning The Systems Thinking Approach
- 2000. Successful Career and Life Planning: The Systems Thinking Approach
- 2000. Systems Thinking Approach to Strategic Planning and Management
- 2002. Successful Strategic Human Resource Planning, with Allan Bandt
- 2004. ABCs of Strategic Management: An Executive Briefing and Plan-to-Plan Day on Strategic Management in the 21st Century
- 2005. Enterprise-Wide Change: Superior Results Through Systems Thinking, with Gail Aller-Stead and James McKinlay
- 2007. Pearls of Wisdom:Facilitation Tools, Tips, and Techniques for Group Leaders, Managers and Executives
