= Sytse Douma =

Sytse Wybren Douma (born 1942) is a Dutch organizational theorist, consultant and Emeritus Professor at the Tilburg School of Economics and Management of the Tilburg University, known for his work with Hein Schreuder on "Economic approaches to organizations".

== Biography ==
Born and raised in Leeuwarden, Douma attended the Gymnasium of Leeuwarden, and in 1967 received his MA in applied mathematics from the University of Groningen.

Douma started his career in 1969 as management consultant at the Dutch consultancy firm Berenschot. From 1974 to 1979 he headed the department of financial services of the private bank MeesPierson. In 1977 he return to the academic world as Associate Professor at the Interfaculteit Bedrijfskunde, where he received his PhD. From 1974 to 1977 he was Professor of Business economics at the Open University, and from 1987 to 2007 Professor Organization of the Enterprise at the Tilburg University. From 2003 to 2007 he was Dean of the Faculty of Technology Management at the Eindhoven University of Technology.

Douma's research interests are in the field of business strategy and economical organization theory. He wrote about nine books and about 90 articles on these topics.

== Publications ==
Books:

- 1979. Lineaire programmering als hulpmiddel bij de besluitvorming. 's-Gravenhage : Academic service.
- 1981. Ondernemingsfinanciering en de financiële steun door de overheid aan individuele ondernemingen in moeilijkheden. Leiden; Antwerpen : Stenfert Kroese.
- 1984. Concurrentie: analyse en strategie. Met Herman Daems. Deventer : Kluwer.
- 1991. Economic Approaches to organizations. 5e editie (2012). Met Hein Schreuder.
- 1992. Analyse van een fusie : strategische, financieel-economische en juridische aspecten van de fusie tussen Nationale-Nederlanden en de NMB Postbank Groep. Met H.G. Barkema en B.T.M. Steins Bisschop. Schoonhoven : Academic Service, Economie en Bedrijfskunde
- 1993. Ondernemingsstrategie. Met Harry Commandeur. Deventer : Kluwer Bedrijfswetenschappen.
- 1994. Basisboek bedrijfskunde : een inleiding in management en ondernemerschap (red.). Schoonhoven : Academic Service, Economie en Bedrijfskunde
