= Jean-Luc Cerdin =

French organizational theorist

Jean-Luc Cerdin (born c. 1974) is a French organizational theorist, Professor at the French business school ESSEC, known for his contributions on human resources management. He has led researches on international career and mobility. He is currently teaching in and has been twice a visiting teacher in American universities (Rutgers University, University of Missouri–St. Louis)

== Selected publications ==
Cerdin has authored and co-authored many publications in his field of expertise.

Books:

- Gooderham, Paul N., Odd Nordhaug, and Jean-Luc Cerdin. International management: cross-boundary challenges. Blackwell Pub., 2003.

Articles, a selection:

- Stahl, Günter K., and Jean-Luc Cerdin. "Global careers in French and German multinational corporations." Journal of Management Development 23.9 (2004): 885–902.
- Lazarova, Mila B., and Jean-Luc Cerdin. "Revisiting repatriation concerns: organizational support versus career and contextual influences." Journal of International Business Studies 38.3 (2007): 404–429.
- Thomas, D. C., Elron, E., Stahl, G., Ekelund, B. Z., Ravlin, E. C., Cerdin, J. L., ... & Lazarova, M. B. (2008). Cultural Intelligence Domain and Assessment. International Journal of Cross Cultural Management, 8(2), 123–143.
