= Juan Antonio Pérez López =

Spanish business theorist (1934–1996)

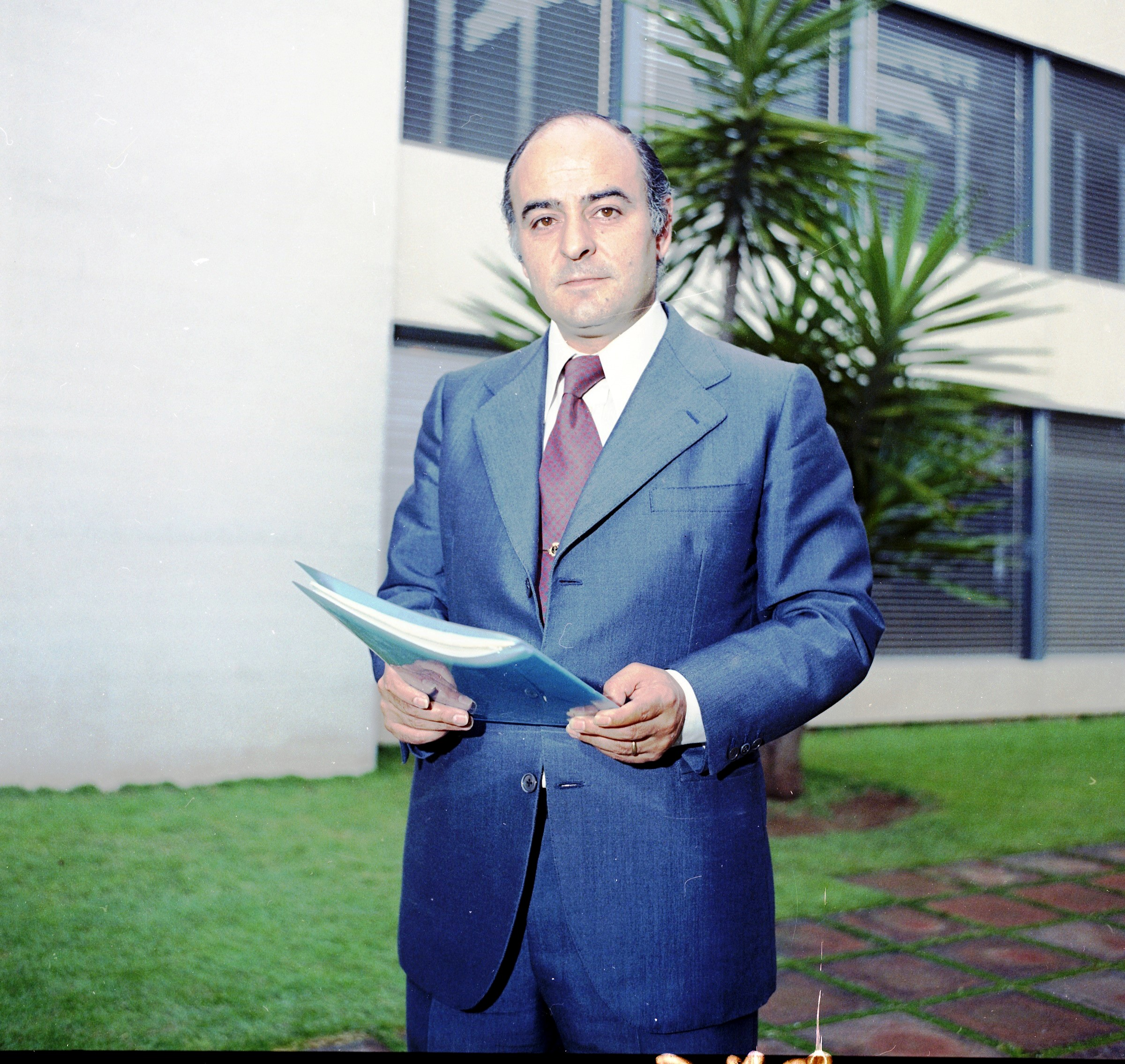
- Born: Juan Antonio Pérez López; 12 June 1934; Spain
- Died: 6 February 1996 (aged 61); Valladolid, Spain

Academic background
- Education: IESE

Juan Antonio Pérez López (1934–1996) was a Spanish business theorist. He was professor of Organizational Behavior at the IESE Business School (Spain), where he became Dean (1978–1984). He was also a visiting professor at PAD Business School of the Universidad de Piura (Peru) and IAE Business School of the Austral University (Argentina). His research and publications focus on Action Theory and its implications for Organizational Behavior. They collect and integrate economic, sociological, and ethical aspects.

== Biography ==
After studying actuarial insurance at the Escuela Central Superior de Comercio of Madrid, Pérez López spent five years in Hidroeléctrica Española SA. In 1961, he began to teach at the IESE Department of Quantitative Analysis (today Department of Accounting and Control). In 1970, he received his Ph.D. (1970) in business administration from Harvard Business School with the thesis Organizational theory: A cybernetical approach. From there on he delved into issues like motivation, learning, rationality, etc.

He was the dean of IESE from October 1978 to September 1984. During his tenure, IESE saw major growth in its international diversity, reaching a total of 7,663 alumni from 36 countries, along with a highly international group of faculty. That period included the launch of the bilingual MBA in 1980, and the Master's Degree for Experienced Professionals (now called Executive MBA) in 1982. IESE also helped found two business schools: the School of Management at the University of Piura (PAD) in Peru in 1979 and the Associação de Estudos Superiores de Empresa (AESE) in Lisbon (Portugal) in 1980. There was also an expansion in the selection of training programs for executives in Spain, offered in cities such as Barcelona, Madrid, Valencia, Pamplona, Sevilla, Bilbao and Santiago de Compostela.

He died on June 2, 1996, in a car accident.

== Contribution ==
The starting point of Pérez López's theory is the concept of learning. "By learning we mean those changes that occur within the agents as a result of the interaction itself, provided that such changes will influence the next interaction."

From this definition, Pérez López distinguishes three types of agents, which he denominates:

1. Stable agent (or stable system): the agent cannot change their decision rules. In other words, no learning takes place.
2. Ultra-stable agent (or ultra-stable system): the agent can learn from the experience and, therefore, modify their decision rules. This learning is always positive and thus, with more experience, better decisions can be made.
3. Freely adaptable agent (or free system): the agent can learn from the experience, but learning is not necessarily positive. Hence the agent has also the possibility of a negative learning.

=== Interactions ===
In an interaction between learning agents, Pérez López finds three types of results.

1. Extrinsic Results: The interaction itself.
2. Intrinsic Results: Learning (changing the decision rule) of the active agent, which occurred when performing the interaction.
3. External Results: Learning of the reactive agent.

When invited to discuss any business decision that would affect other people, he would ask: What results will I get? What am I going to learn, both from an operational and structural point of view? What will the other person learn with the same dimensions? “When you go deep into the study of the action, you conclude that results are not only external but they have repercussions on the agent, increasing or decreasing the personal richness he has at the moment of putting it to practice. That is why, what is called the double result of the action goes farther away from the unilateralism of pragmatism. The internal result of the action is more important than its external consequences, as it modifies the subject´s capacity for the execution of ulterior actions. That peculiar feedback is absolutely absent in the mechanicist interpretation of action… Perez Lopez does not exactly elaborate a theory of isolated action, or of a single subject, but what I will call a theory of reciprocal action; that is, about the repercussions that the actions of one agent have in the actions of other agents”.

=== Motivations and motives ===
Pérez López assumes that agents have an impulse that is a potential motivation to achieve a higher satisfaction. This potential motivation becomes an actual motivation with a particular decision depending on two types of motivation.

- A spontaneous motivation, which is based on the expected satisfaction (through memory) of what an interaction will produce.
- A rational motivation, which is an "abstract recognition of the desirability of implementing or not an action on the basis of the abstract evaluation a priori to its consequences."

To control the momentum of spontaneous motivation to implement the advice of rational motivation, we need a reality that is called virtue. The consequences of action are grouped in three types of motives.

- Extrinsic motives: Aspects of reality that determine the achievement of satisfactions that result from the interactions.
- Intrinsic motives: Aspects of reality that determine the achievement of decision-maker's own learning.
- Transcendent motives: Aspects of reality that determine the achievement of learning from other people with whom the decision-maker interacts.

=== Negative learning ===
"It's a learning process that facilitates the achievement of results, when that achievement in itself involves the destruction of the conditions necessary to continue catching up." The negative learning has the following basic features. It seeks to solve a partial problem, without considering the general problem, which the partial problem is part of. The solutions found to the partial problem are suboptimal from the standpoint of the general problem. Successive resolutions of the partial problem generate learning, and therefore an increased motivation to make choices suboptimal from the standpoint of the general problem. The general problem becomes more difficult to resolve. An example would be "an amateur sportsman who practices without the guidance of an expert. What is most probable is that he will develop habits that will be counterproductive for the proper practice of such sport". Not considering external results (learning of reactive agents) in the analysis of an action always produce negative learning.

== Publications ==
- Pérez López, J. A. (1974). "Organizational control theory: a formal approach", IESE Research Paper, July 1974, WP nº 4.
- Pérez López, J.A. (1974). "Organizational theory: a cybernetic approach", IESE Research Paper, July 1974, WP nº 5.
- Pérez López, J.A. (1987). "El sentido de los conflictos éticos originados por el entorno en que opera la empresa", Cuadernos Empresa y Humanismo, N° 4, University of Navarra, Pamplona.
- Pérez López, J.A. (1990). "El poder... ¿para qué?", Cuadernos Empresa y Humanismo, N° 29, University of Navarra, Pamplona.
- Pérez López, J.A.; Chinchilla, N. (1991). "Business or Enterprise? Different Approaches for the Management of People in Organizations", IESE Publishing, Barcelona.
- Pérez López, J.A.; Chinchilla, N. (1991). "Social Effectiveness and Self-Control", IESE Publishing, Barcelona.
- Pérez López, J.A. (1991). Teoría de la acción humana en las organizaciones: la acción personal, Rialp, Madrid.
- Pérez López, J.A. (1994.) Fundamentos de la dirección de empresas, Rialp, Madrid.
- Pérez López, J.A. (1997), Liderazgo, Volume 11 from Biblioteca IESE de Gestión de Empresas, Folio, Barcelona, 1997.
- Pérez López, J.A. (1998). Liderazgo y ética en la dirección de empresas: la nueva empresa del siglo XXI, Deusto, Bilbao.
- Pérez López, J.A. (2001). "Una ética para los líderes del siglo XXI", in Álvarez de Mon, Santiago (ed.), Paradigmas del Liderazgo: claves de la dirección de personas, McGraw-Hill.
- Pérez López, J.A. "El hombre de empresa frente a la crisis actual", Revista de Egresados PAD, Universidad de Piura, December 2008.

== On Perez Lopez's theory ==
- Vélaz, J.I. (1996). y motivación en la empresa. Madrid: Díaz de Santos.
- Alcázar, M. (2010). Las decisiones directivas: una aproximación antropológica al logro de aprendizajes positivos en la persona y las organizaciones. Tesis doctoral. Universidad de Navarra.
- Alcázar, M. (2102). Dirección: motivaciones, motivos, vínculos y oportunismos, Quito, IDE.
- Chinchilla, N. (1996). Rotación de directivos. Barcelona: Gestión 2000.
- Ferreiro, P. & Alcázar, M. (2002). "Gobierno de personas en la empresa". Lima: PAD-University of Piura.
- Ferreiro, P. (2013). "El Octógono: un diagnóstico completo de la realidad empresarial". Lima: PAD-University of Piura.
- Ariño, M.A. (2005). Toma de decisiones y gobierno de organizaciones. Bilbao: Deusto.
- Alcázar, M. (2005). "Introducción al Octógono". Pamplona: Cuadernos Empresa y Humanismo, N° 93.
- Rosanas, J.M. (2008). "Beyond economic criteria: a humanistic approach to organizational survival", Journal of Business Ethics, 78(3), 447–462.
- Rosanas, J.M. (2012). “Beyond Effectiveness: Attractiveness and Unity as Criteria For Decision-Making in Organizations”, The European Business Review, January–February, 38–41.
- Rosanas, J.M. (2013). "Decision-Making in an Organizational Context: Beyond Economic Criteria", Palgrave Macmillan.
