= Chester Elton =

Canadian writer

Chester Greig Elton
- Born: 1958 (age 67–68); Canada
- Education: Brigham Young University
- Occupation: Writer
- Known for: The Carrot Principle
- Spouse: Heidi Elton
- Children: 4
- Website: The Culture Works

Chester Greig Elton is a Canadian writer. He writes on employee engagement and organizational culture.

== Career ==
In 2011, he co-founded The Culture Works, a consulting firm. Among his notable books are The Carrot Principle, All In, Leading with Gratitude, and Anxiety at Work, co-authored with Adrian Gostick.

== Books ==
- Managing with Carrots: Using Recognition to Attract and Retain the Best People (with Chester Elton and Adrian Gostick, 2001) ISBN 1-58685-077-6
- The 24-Carrot Manager: A Remarkable Story of How a Leader Can Unleash Human Potential (with Chester Elton and Adrian Gostick, 2002) ISBN 1-58685-154-3
- A Carrot a Day: A Daily Dose of Recognition for Your Employees (with Chester Elton and Adrian Gostick, 2004) ISBN 1-58685-506-9
- The Invisible Employee: Realizing the Hidden Potential in Everyone (with Chester Elton and Adrian Gostick, 2006) ISBN 0-471-77739-0
- The Carrot Principle (with Chester Elton and Adrian Gostick, Reissue 2009) ISBN 1-4391-4917-8
- The Daily Carrot Principle: 365 Ways to Enhance Your Career and Life (with Chester Elton and Adrian Gostick, 2010) ISBN 1-4391-8173-X
- The Orange Revolution: How One Great Team can Transform an Entire Organization (with Chester Elton and Adrian Gostick, 2010) ISBN 1-4391-8245-0
- All In: How The Best Managers Create a Culture of Belief and Drive Big Results (with Chester Elton and Adrian Gostick, 2012) ISBN 978-1491511619
- What Motivates Me: Put Your Passions to Work (with Chester Elton and Adrian Gostick, 2014) ISBN 978-0996029704
- The Best Team Wins: The New Science of High Performance (with Chester Elton and Adrian Gostick, 2014) ISBN 978-1501179860
- Leading with Gratitude: Eight Leadership Practices for Extraordinary Business Results(with Adrian Gostick, 2020) ISBN 978-0062965783
- Anxiety at Work: 8 Strategies to Help Teams Build Resilience, Handle Uncertainty, and Get Stuff Done(with Adrian Gostick, 2021) ISBN 978-0063046153

== See also ==
- Adrian Gostick
