= Rebecca Piekkari =

Finnish organizational theorist

Rebecca Marschan-Piekkari (born Dec. 4, 1967) is a Finnish organizational theorist and Professor of International Business at the Aalto University, and Vice Dean of its Department of Management Studies, known for her work on "international business research." and on multinational corporations.

== Life and work ==
Piekkari obtained her MSc in International Business in 1990 at the Helsinki School of Economics, where she also obtained her PhD in International Business in 1990 with the thesis, entitled "New Structural Forms and Inter-unit Communication in Multinationals: The Case of Kone Elevators."

After her graduation she started her academic career as Visiting researcher at the University of Groningen in 1997 and as Visiting researcher at INSEAD and as Visiting lecturer at the Copenhagen Business School in 1998. In 1999 she was appointed Research Associate at the Sheffield University, Management School, and the next year was Lecturer at the University of Bath, School of Management. From 2002 to 2004 she was Research Fellow at the Hanken School of Economics. In 2004 she was appointed Professor of International Business at the Aalto University, Department of Management and International Business.

Piekkari's research interests are in the field of "international business; qualitative research methods in international business; organizational structures and control mechanisms in multinational corporations, diversity management; headquarters and foreign subsidiaries in multinational corporations; regional management."

== Selected publications ==
- Marschan-Piekkari, Rebecca, and Catherine Welch, eds. Handbook of qualitative research methods for international business. Edward Elgar Publishing, 2004.
- Marschan-Piekkari, Rebecca, and Catherine Welch, eds. Rethinking the case study in international business and management research. Edward Elgar Publishing, 2011.

Articles, a selection:

- Marschan-Piekkari, Rebecca, Denice Welch, and Lawrence Welch. "In the shadow: The impact of language on structure, power and communication in the multinational." International Business Review 8.4 (1999): 421-440.
- Vaara, E., Tienari, J., Piekkari, R., & Säntti, R. (2005). "Language and the circuits of power in a merging multinational corporation." Journal of Management Studies, 42(3), 595-623.
- Piekkari, Rebecca, Catherine Welch, and Eriikka Paavilainen. "The case study as disciplinary convention: Evidence from international business journals." Organizational research methods (2008).
- Welch, C., Piekkari, R., Plakoyiannaki, E., & Paavilainen-Mäntymäki, E. (2011). "Theorising from case studies: Towards a pluralist future for international business research." Journal of International Business Studies, 42(5), 740-762.
