= Richard F. Ericson =

American academic (1919–1993)

Richard Ferdinand Ericson (1919–1993) was an American organizational theorist, professor emeritus of management and director of the Interdisciplinary Systems and Cybernetics Project, Program of Policy Studies in Science and Technology at George Washington University in Washington, D.C.

== Biography ==
Richard Ericson received a bachelor's with Phi Beta Kappa and a master's degree at University of Chicago and received his doctorate in economics at Indiana University Bloomington in 1952.

He was a full professor at Stetson University and head of the Department of Management in the School of Business from 1952 to 1956. From 1956 he was appointed associate professor of management in hospital administration at the State University of Iowa. In 1959 he was a consultant to the Ohio Department of Transportation. After that he moved to Washington DC in 1960, where he had been named professor of business administration at George Washington University, and there in 1969 he became professor of management.

Ericson was organizationally active. He was chairman of the Comparative Administration Task Force at the Academy of Management from 1966 to 1968, and president and managing director of the Society for General Systems Research in 1968 for a year. In 1969 he became director of the Interdisciplinary Systems and Cybernetics Project, Program of Policy Studies in Science and Technology at George Washington University in Washington, D.C.

Ericson was a member of Phi Beta Kappa, Beta Gamma Sigma, the American Economic Association, the American Management Association, the Society for General Systems Research, the American Cybernetics Association, the Academy of Management, the American Association for the Advancement of Science, and the World Future Society.

One of his students was an author on management and systems thinking Stephen G. Haines.

== Work ==
Ericson's research interests were in the fields of general systems and cybernetics approaches to management theory and practice, value issues in contemporary management. Ericson (1979) believed that "society has now thrust upon it a kind of moral imperative to focus efforts on the utilization of general systems concepts and conceptualizations by policy-forming executives, administrators, and managers in all kinds of large-scale organizations."

=== Visions of Cybernetic Organizations, 1972 ===
In his 1972 paper "Visions of Cybernetic Organizations" Ericson stipulated, that in his days a great number of people associated the word "cybernetics" with "computerized information networks, closed loop systems, and robotized man-surrogates, such as artorgas and cyborgs."

The essence of the cybernetic organization, Ericson argued is that "they are self-controlling, self-maintaining, self-realizing. Indeed, cybernetics has been characterized as the science of effective organization, in just these terms." In modern organizational cybernetics, the organization is viewed as "a subsystem of a larger system(s), and as comprised itself of functionally interdependent subsystems."

=== Society for General Systems Research ===
Ericson was president of the Society for General Systems Research in the year 1978–79. In his presidential address at the annual meeting in Houston. as Gaines (1979) recalled, Ericson "called for an action research agenda for the Society for General Systems Research where action research is that which results from application of transforming concepts and techniques in an ongoing real world organizational context."

== Publications ==
Ericson has written and edited several books and articles. A selection:

- 1969. Organizational cybernetics and human values. Program of Policy Studies in Science and Technology. Monograph. George Washington University.
- 1969. Toward increasing the social relevance of the contemporary university. Program of Policy Studies in Science and Technology, George Washington University.
- 1968. The impact of cybernetic information technology on management value systems. Program of Policy Studies in Science and Technology, George Washington University.
- 1971. The policy analysis role of the contemporary university. Program of Policy Studies in Science and Technology. Reprint. Program of Policy Studies in Science and Technology, George Washington University.
- 1978. Avoiding social catastrophes and maximizing social opportunities : the general systems challenge : Proceedings of the 22nd annual North American meeting, Washington, D.C., February 13–15, 1978. Richard F. Ericson, proceedings coordinator. Washington : Society for General Systems Research.
- 1979. Improving the Human Condition; quality and stability in social systems. Edited. Washington, Society for General Systems Research.

Articles, a selection

- 1958. "Should Management be Idealistic?" Harvard Business Review, September/October 1958.
- 1963. "Toward a Universally Viable Philosophy of Management". In: Management Technology, Volume 3, Number 1 (May, 1963), pages 33–55
- 1966. "Research Scholar's View of Administrative Theory," Proceedings of the Academy of Management, March 1966;
- 1969. Toward Increasing the Social Relevance of the Contemporary University, Program of Policy Studies, August 1969;
- 1969. "The Impact of Cybernetic Information Technology on Management Value Systems," Management Science, October, 1969
- 1972. "Visions of Cybernetic Organizations". In: The Academy of Management Journal, Volume 15, Number 4, General Systems Theory (Dec., 1972), pages 427–443.
- 1970. "The policy analysis role of the contemporary university". In: Journal Policy Sciences. Issue Volume 1, Number 1 / March, 1970. pages 429–442.
- 1985. "Thinking and Management Values in the Microchip Era: An Action Agenda for Institutional Transformation". In: Systems Research 2 (volume 1), 1985, pages 29–32.
