= Noel Capon =

American organizational theorist

- Born: Southampton, Hampshire, England
- Education: London University (BSc, PhD); Harvard University (MBA); Columbia University (PhD)
- Occupation: Marketing Professor
- Employer: Columbia University
- Known for: R. C. Kopf Professor of International Marketing
- Spouse: Deanna Kuhn

Noel Capon (born 1937) is an American organizational theorist, and the R.C. Kopf Professor of International Marketing at Columbia Business School.

== Biography ==
Capon received his BSc and PhD in Chemistry from the University College London his PhD from Manchester Business School, his MBA from Harvard University and another PhD from Columbia University in 1975 with a thesis entitled "Experimental evaluation of alternative message variables in personal selling and direct mail advertising".

Capon had previously held faculty positions at UCLA Anderson School of Management and Harvard Business School before joining Columbia in 1979. He served as Chair of Marketing at both UCLA and Columbia. He has been visiting professor at INSEAD (France), Hong Kong University of Science and Technology (HKUST), and the China Europe International Business School (CEIBS), Shanghai, PRC.

Capon has taught marketing, and sales and strategic account management courses to MBA and EMBA students at Columbia University and at many educational institutions as a visiting professor. He also contributes to Columbia Business School's Executive Education and has designed, directed, and taught in a wide variety of marketing, sales management, and strategic and global account management programs. He also designs, directs and teaches in numerous custom programs for major corporations globally. Professor Capon co-founded The Chief Sales Executive Forum, now in its 10th year, and sits on the board of the Strategic Account Management Association.

== Publications ==
Capon has published over 60 refereed articles and book chapters, and has published more than 20 books, including:

- Corporate Strategic Planning (Columbia 1988)
- The Marketing of Financial Services: A Book of Cases (Prentice-Hall 1992)
- Why Some Firms Perform better than Others: Towards a More Integrative Explanation (Kluwer 1996)
- Planning the Development of Builders, Leaders and Managers of Twenty First Century Business (Kluwer 1996)
- The Asian Marketing Case Book (Prentice Hall 1999)
- Key Account Management and Planning (Free Press 2001)
- Total Integrated Marketing (Free Press 2003)
- The Marketing Mavens (Crown Business 2007).
- Managing Global Accounts (Wessex 2008)
- Strategic Account Strategy (Wessex 2011)
- Sales Eats First (Wessex 2011)
