= Gerry Morgan =

Canadian entrepreneur and educator

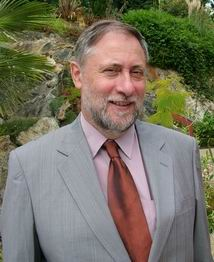
Gerry Morgan

Gerry Morgan (born June 8, 1953) is a Canadian entrepreneur and educator specializing in ICT and creating working private-public partnerships. He has worked within the Canadian schooling system for almost 20 years. He has developed ICT learning resources to support classroom and administrative practices.

== Educator and Entrepreneur ==
Gerry is currently the Principal of the International Division of Changchun Experimental School in Changchun City, Jilin Province, China. The school has 3500 students (Grade 10-12) currently enrolled. The past three years were spent in Thailand as Principal of the British Columbia International School in Bangkok. Gerry remains active in teaching technology, geography, English, and video and film.

Gerry has pioneered the use of opensource educational systems and digital libraries in schools and installed several comprehensive systems in China and Thailand.

Gerry Morgan is the founder of Ink Media Inc. (Founded:2002) with the mission of building a low cost computer for emerging nations with the premise that low cost computers could be built that would help to avoid the ownership pitfalls of modern computers and would have no need for virus protection or ongoing maintenance. As a result, demonstrating that this could be done, Gerry produced several models of what emerged as the InkMedia mobile computer.

Gerry's research work and contributions have encapsulated developing ICT systems and training for school districts and at a provincial level, distance education delivery systems, online ICT collaborative tools, private-public social infrastructure projects, reproducible systems that can be adapted internationally and development of a low cost Rom based computer InkMedia.

Gerry carries a B.Ed. Curriculum & Instruction from the University of Calgary and MA in Education from the Antioch University, Seattle.

== Awards ==
Gerry Morgan has received the following awards in light of his contributions at both national and international level:

- Marshall McLuhan Distinguished Teacher Award (Medal and cash award)
