= Biohit =

Finnish biotechnology company

Biohit Oyj
- Company type: Julkinen osakeyhtiö
- Traded as: Nasdaq Helsinki: BIOBV.B
- Industry: Medical equipment
- Founded: 1988; 38 years ago
- Founder: Osmo Suovaniemi
- Headquarters: Helsinki, Finland
- Area served: Worldwide
- Key people: Osmo Suovaniemi (Founder and Chairman of the Board), Semi Korpela (President and CEO)
- Products: Diagnostics and medical devices (Acetium products for acid free stomach and smoking cessation)
- Total equity: €15.5 million (2019)
- Number of employees: 40 in Finland, 10 in subsidiaries
- Website: www.biohithealthcare.com

Biohit Oyj is a Finnish company which develops, manufactures, and markets biotech and diagnostics products for use in research and health care.

== Summary ==
Biohit was established in 1988 in Finland by Professor Osmo Suovaniemi (M.D., Ph.D.), previously known as the founder of Labsystems. He stepped down from the CEO position in June 2011, but remains actively involved with the company through positions on several advisory boards. Biohit is a globally operating Finnish biotechnology company. Biohit is headquartered in Helsinki and has subsidiaries in Italy and the UK. Biohit's Series B share (BIOBV) has been quoted on NASDAQ OMX Helsinki since 1999, Small cap/Healthcare. Semi Korpela was appointed CEO in 2011.

== Markets ==
Biohit's two businesses are acetaldehyde-eliminating products and diagnostics. More than 90% of Biohit's sales occur outside Finland.

=== Diagnostic tests ===
The diagnostic product range of Biohit includes the GastroPanel examinations, which are used to aid diagnosis of Helicobacter pylori infection and atrophic gastritis from a blood sample. They are also ideal tools for the identification of patients at increased risk of gastric cancer, peptic ulcer disease, gastroesophageal reflux disease (GERD), and deficiencies of vitamin B12, calcium, and iron. In addition to this, Biohit offers Quick tests for the detection of

- Lactose intolerance
- Helicobacter pylori infection
- Celiac disease
- Screening of colorectal cancer

=== Acetaldehyde binding products ===
In 2018 was launched a new, nicotine-free smoking cessation product, Acetium Lozenge.

=== Monoclonal antibodies ===
Biohit also develops and manufactures monoclonal antibodies for research use and use as raw materials for the diagnostic industry.

=== Instruments ===
Adopting a systems approach, Biohit also provides laboratory equipment, such as microplate instruments and automates, as well as liquid handling products to support Biohit ELISA tests.

=== Distribution network ===
A network of 40 distributors, including 2 subsidiaries, in more than 40 countries is selling Biohit products. In the U.S. the official distributor is Bio Testing Supplies, a division of Avrio Genetics.

== Research, development, and intellectual property ==
Biohit spends roughly 30% of net sales on basic research each year and pursues an aggressive patenting strategy.
