= Vern Terpstra =

- Born: 27 August 1927
- Died: 6 November 2013 (aged 86)
- Education: University of Michigan
- Occupation: Professor
- Spouse: Bonnie Terpstra
- Children: Kathryn Ann Caliendo; James Richard Terpstra

Vern Terpstra (August 20, 1927 – November 6, 2013) was Professor Emeritus of international business at the Ross School of Business, University of Michigan. He was a fellow of the Academy of International Business.

== Biography ==
=== Early life and education ===
PHD, University Of Michigan, 1965
MBA, University Of Michigan, 1951
BBA, University Of Michigan, 1950

=== Career ===
Professor Terpstra received his B.BA, M.BA, and Ph.D. degrees from the University of Michigan in 1950, 1951, and 1965, respectively. Following completion of his Ph.D. degree, he was an assistant professor at the Wharton School at the University of Pennsylvania for two years before joining the faculty at the University of Michigan School of Business Administration as an associate professor in 1966. As only the second member of the growing international business faculty, Professor Terpstra brought a wealth of experience in the international area, including training at the University of Brussels and nine years of educational missionary service in the Congo. He was promoted to professor of international business in 1971.

== Published works ==
- International Marketing (Holt, Rinehart and Winston, 1967)
- The Cultural Environment of International Business (South-Western Pub. Co., 1978)
