= Teemu Malmi =

Finnish organizational theorist (born 1965)

Teemu Malmi (born October 17, 1965) is a Finnish organizational theorist, a professor at the Aalto University, Department of Accounting and Finance, and Chairman of the Board of the Aalto University Executive Education. He is known for his research on the use of the balanced scorecard in Finnish companies and his work on management control systems.

== Life and work ==
Born in Helsinki, Finland, Malmi took his studies in economics, with a specialization in accounting and finance, at the Helsinki School of Economics. He obtained his MSc in 1990, and his Lic.Sc in 1994 and his Ph.D. in 1997 with a thesis entitled "Adoption and implementation of activity-based costing: practice, problems and motives".

Malmi has spent most of his academic career at the Helsinki School of Economics, which became the Aalto University School of Business in 2010. He started out as Assistant in the Department of Accounting and Finance in 1990, and became assistant professor in 1995, associate professor in 1999 and full professor since 2001. Since 2011 he also chairs the accounting faculty and since 2013 the Department of Accounting and Finance. On 1 January 2015 he was appointed Jaakko Honko Professor at the School of Business. He was a visiting professor at the University of Technology, Sydney in 2003–2005.

== Selected publications ==
Malmi, Teemu. Adoption and implementation of activity-based costing: practice, problems and motives. Helsinki School of Economics and Business Administration, 1997.

=== Articles, a selection ===
- Malmi, Teemu. "Activity-based costing diffusion across organizations: an exploratory empirical analysis of Finnish firms." Accounting, Organizations and Society 24.8 (1999): 649–672.
- Malmi, Teemu. "Balanced scorecards in Finnish companies: a research note." Management Accounting Research 12.2 (2001): 207–220.
- Malmi, Teemu, and David A. Brown. "Management control systems as a package—Opportunities, challenges and research directions." Management accounting research 19.4 (2008): 287–300.
