= Eric Dent =

- Born: 20 November 1961 (age 64)
- Education: Emory University (B.A. 1983, M.A. 1983); George Washington University (M.A. 1986, Ph.D 1997)
- Occupation: Professor at Florida Gulf Coast University

Eric B. Dent (born November 20, 1961), Ph.D. holds the Uncommon Friends Endowed Chair in Ethics at Florida Gulf Coast University. Earlier in his career he served as the Dean of the School of Business at the University of North Carolina at Pembroke

== Life ==
Eric Dent was raised in Boca Raton, Florida, where he attended St. Andrew's School. After graduating, he attended Emory University, receiving M.S. and B.S. degrees in Computer Science. Dent then moved to Gaithersburg, Maryland where he worked for IBM, designing satellite communication systems. For several years Dent worked as a management consultant with Macro International. Dent later served as Vice President, Operations and General Manager of the Washington, DC office of the Todd Organization, a national executive compensation consulting firm.

In 1993, Dent founded Always Improvement, a management consulting firm dedicated to organizational improvement.

Dent holds an M.B.A with a major in Organizational Behavior and Development and a minor in Finance. Mid-career, he began his doctoral work, receiving a Ph.D in Management and Organization from the School of Business and Public Management at George Washington University. During this time, he taught as an adjunct professor at the University of Maryland University College, where he would later become the Executive Director of the Doctoral Programs.

During 2002-2003 Dent co-hosted LeaderTalk, a radio talk show in which CEOs and other thought leaders were interviewed about their business wisdom.

He began his tenure as Dean of the School of Business at the University of North Carolina at Pembroke in 2003 and ended 2008.

He left the University of North Carolina at Pembroke for Fayetteville State University in 2012, where he served as professor of leadership and chair of the faculty senate in this historically-black college or university (HBCU). In 2016 he moved to Florida Gulf Coast University, where he now holds the Uncommon Friends Endowed Chair in Ethics.

Dent has twice visited Cuba, lecturing at the Biennial Seminar on the Philosophical, Epistemological and Methodological Implications of Complexity Theory conference, the second time speaking on "The Challenges of Observation, Inquiry, and Measurement in Complexity Theory."

Dent is a lifelong Methodist, previously attending Chestnut Street UMC when he resided in Lumberton, NC.

== Annotated list of works ==
- "America, A Proselytizing Society"
- "Can We Agree on the Force, and Call it God? Multi-disciplined Evidence and Organizational Implications"
- "The Observation, Inquiry, and Measurement Challenges Surfaced by Complexity Theory"
- “Worldview Assumptions: Paradigm Shift in Progress?”
- "Challenging Resistance to Change"
- "Seinfeld, Professor of Organizational Behavior: The Psychological Contract and Systems Thinking"
- *Full List

== Quotes ==
- "Complexity theory is an approach to research, study, and perspective that is holistic, interdependent and nonhierarchical."
