= Albert S. Humphrey =

American business and management consultant

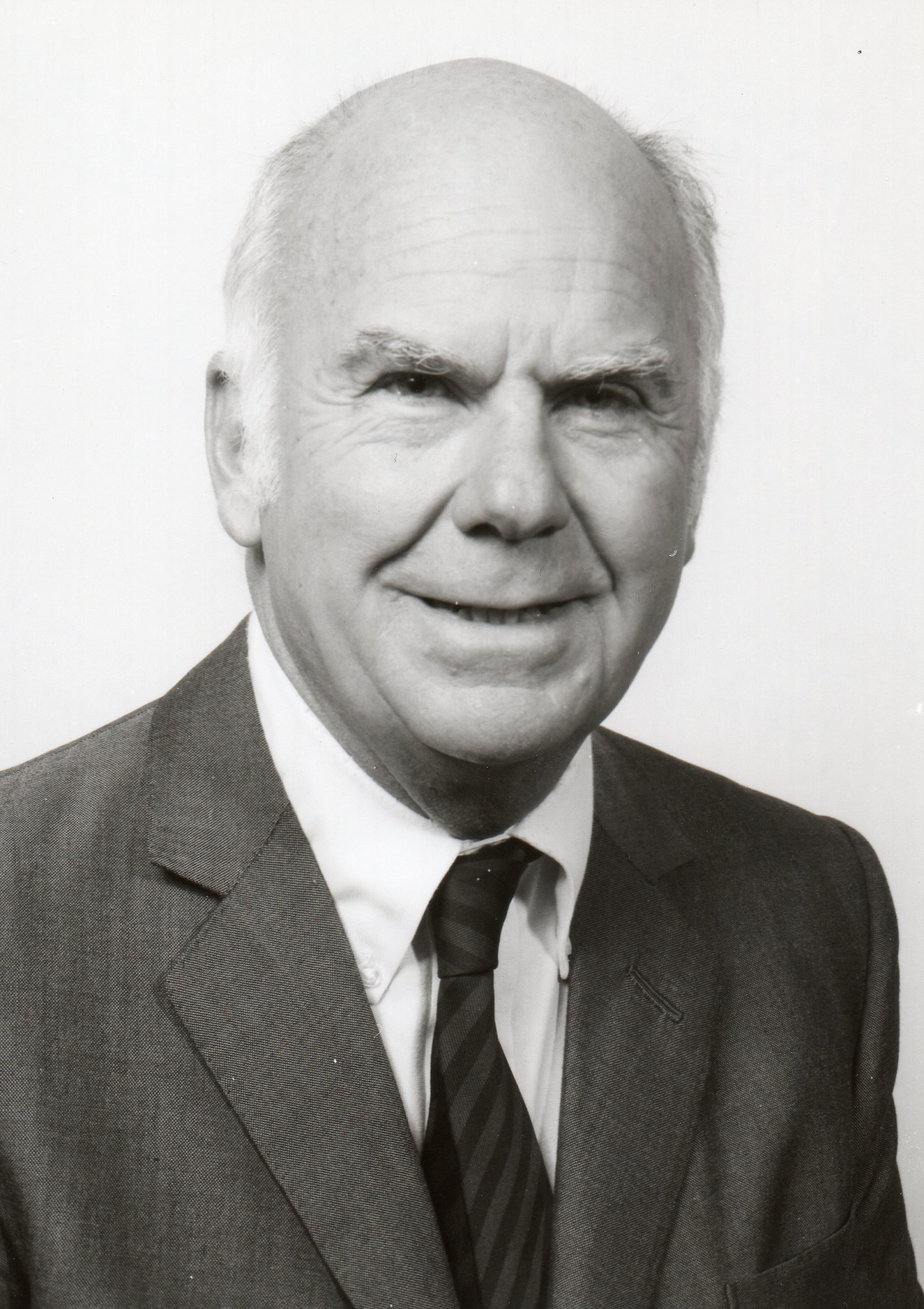
- Born: 2 June 1926
- Died: 31 October 2005 (aged 79)
- Education: University of Illinois (B.Sc.), M.I.T. (M.Sc.), Harvard University (MBA)
- Scientific career
- Fields: Management
- Workplaces: Stanford Research Institute

Albert S. Humphrey (2 June 1926 – 31 October 2005) was an American business and management consultant who specialized in organizational management and cultural change. Initially earning degrees in chemical engineering in Illinois, he eventually moved to London.

== Education ==
Albert Humphrey was educated at the University of Illinois, where he graduated with a B.Sc. in chemical engineering. After this he gained a master's degree in chemical engineering at M.I.T. and an MBA at Harvard University.

== Career ==
Humphrey said that while he worked at the Stanford Research Institute (later SRI International), he was involved with the team that came up with the "International Executive Seminar in Business Planning", which became known as TAM (Team Action Management), and also with a team led by Robert Stewart, who published the SOFT framework (as Humphrey described it: "What is good in the present is Satisfactory, good in the future is an Opportunity; bad in the present is a Fault, and bad in the future is a Threat"). For a summary of the relationship of SOFT to SWOT analysis, see SWOT analysis § History.

During his working life Humphrey acted as consultant to over 100 companies globally. In 2005 he was listed in:

- Who's Who in the World
- Debrett's People of Today
- Who's Who in the City
- The Directory of Directors

In 2004 he was listed in the Who's Who in Science and Engineering, 7th Edition (2003–2004).
