= Marketing effectiveness =

Marketing term

Marketing effectiveness is the measure of how effective a given marketer's go to market strategy is toward meeting the goal of maximizing their spending to achieve positive results in both the short- and long-term.

== Modern measurement approaches ==
Marketing effectiveness measurement increasingly uses complementary approaches including return on ad spend (ROAS) metrics, marketing mix modeling (MMM), and incrementality testing to provide a more complete picture of marketing performance.

Return on ad spend (ROAS) tracks the direct revenue attributed to advertising spend through digital tracking and attribution models. While useful for optimization within digital channels, ROAS has limitations as it relies on last-touch or multi-touch attribution that may not capture true incremental impact.

Marketing mix modeling (MMM) uses statistical analysis of historical data to understand how different marketing activities contribute to business outcomes. MMM can measure effects across all channels including traditional media, account for external factors like seasonality and competitive activity, and provide long-term impact measurement. However, MMM requires regular calibration through experiments to maintain accuracy and optimize marketing allocation decisions.

Incrementality testing measures the true causal impact of marketing by comparing outcomes between groups exposed and not exposed to marketing activities. This approach is critical because marketing effectiveness should be evaluated based on incremental conversions—the additional conversions caused by marketing—rather than attributed conversions, which may include customers who would have converted anyway.

Best practices in modern measurement involve using all three approaches together: incrementality tests to calibrate and validate MMM models, MMM to understand cross-channel effects and optimize budget allocation, and ROAS for day-to-day campaign management within channels.

== Return on marketing investment (ROMI) ==
Return on Marketing Investment (ROMI) is the contribution to profit attributable to marketing (net of marketing spending), divided by the marketing invested or risked. ROMI differs from other return-on-investment (ROI) metrics because marketing spending is typically expensed in the current period (operational expenditure or OPEX) rather than tied up in capital assets like plants and inventories (capital expenditure or CAPEX).

The ROMI concept came to prominence in the 1990s, with the phrase "return on marketing investment" becoming widespread in the 2000s following publication of books by Guy Powell (2002) and James Lenskold (2003). A necessary step in calculating ROMI is the measurement and estimation of incremental sales attributed to marketing, or "incrementality."

There are two main forms of ROMI:

Short-term ROMI measures the immediate returns from marketing activities, typically used as a simple index measuring dollars of revenue (or market share, contribution margin, or other outputs) for every dollar of marketing spent. It is best employed as a tool to determine marketing effectiveness and help steer investments from less productive to more productive activities. Short-term ROMI is often criticized for only including the direct impact of marketing activities without accounting for long-term brand building value.

Long-term ROMI is a more sophisticated measure that considers the lifetime value of customers acquired through marketing efforts and the sustained impact on brand equity. It requires intensive data analysis and integration of business analytics with marketing analytics. Long-term ROMI helps firms assess value for money challenges and make strategic resource allocation decisions.

== Factors driving marketing effectiveness ==
Corporate factors: Each company operates within different bounds determined by their size, budget, and organizational structure. Companies segment markets based on how consumers value product attributes and brands relative to price. Consumers build brand value through exposure to brand information over time from sources including advertising, word-of-mouth, and distribution channels, often characterized through the purchase funnel, a McKinsey & Company concept.

Exogenous factors: External influences including economic conditions, social trends, technological advancements, legal frameworks, and competitive dynamics significantly impact marketing effectiveness. These factors shape consumer behavior, communication strategies, available marketing channels, regulatory constraints, and competitive positioning decisions.

Marketing strategy: Improving marketing effectiveness can be achieved by employing a superior marketing strategy. By positioning the product or brand correctly, the product/brand will be more successful in the market than competitors' products/brands. The match-up between the product, the consumer lifestyle, and the endorser is important for effectiveness of brand communication.

Marketing creative: Better creatives can improve results even without a change in strategy. AFLAC achieved significant results with its introduction of the Duck campaign, with company growth rate increasing from 12% prior to the campaign to 28% following it. Creatives establish corporate identity and play a significant role in brand recollection through point of purchase displays, brochures, and product packaging. Consistency in design across various mediums helps reinforce brand offerings in consumer minds.

Marketing execution: By improving how marketers execute their go-to-market approach, they can achieve greater results without changing their strategy or creative execution. At the marketing mix level, marketers can improve execution through changes in the 4-Ps (Product, Price, Place and Promotion). At the program level, marketers can improve effectiveness by managing campaigns better, maintaining consistency across various media (TV, Radio, Print, and Online). Examples include improving direct mail through better calls-to-action or editing website content to improve organic search results. A growing area of interest within marketing strategy and execution involves the interaction dynamics of traditional marketing (TV, events) with online consumer activity (social media). Traditional marketing can become a catalyst for consumer brand engagement online.

Marketing infrastructure (also known as marketing management): Improving the business of marketing can lead to significant gains for the company. Management of agencies, budgeting, motivation and coordination of marketing activities can lead to improved competitiveness and results. Overall accountability for brand leadership and business results is often reflected in an organization through a Brand management department.

== See also ==
- Marketing engineering
- Media intelligence
