= Frank E. Webner =

American consulting cost accountant and early management author

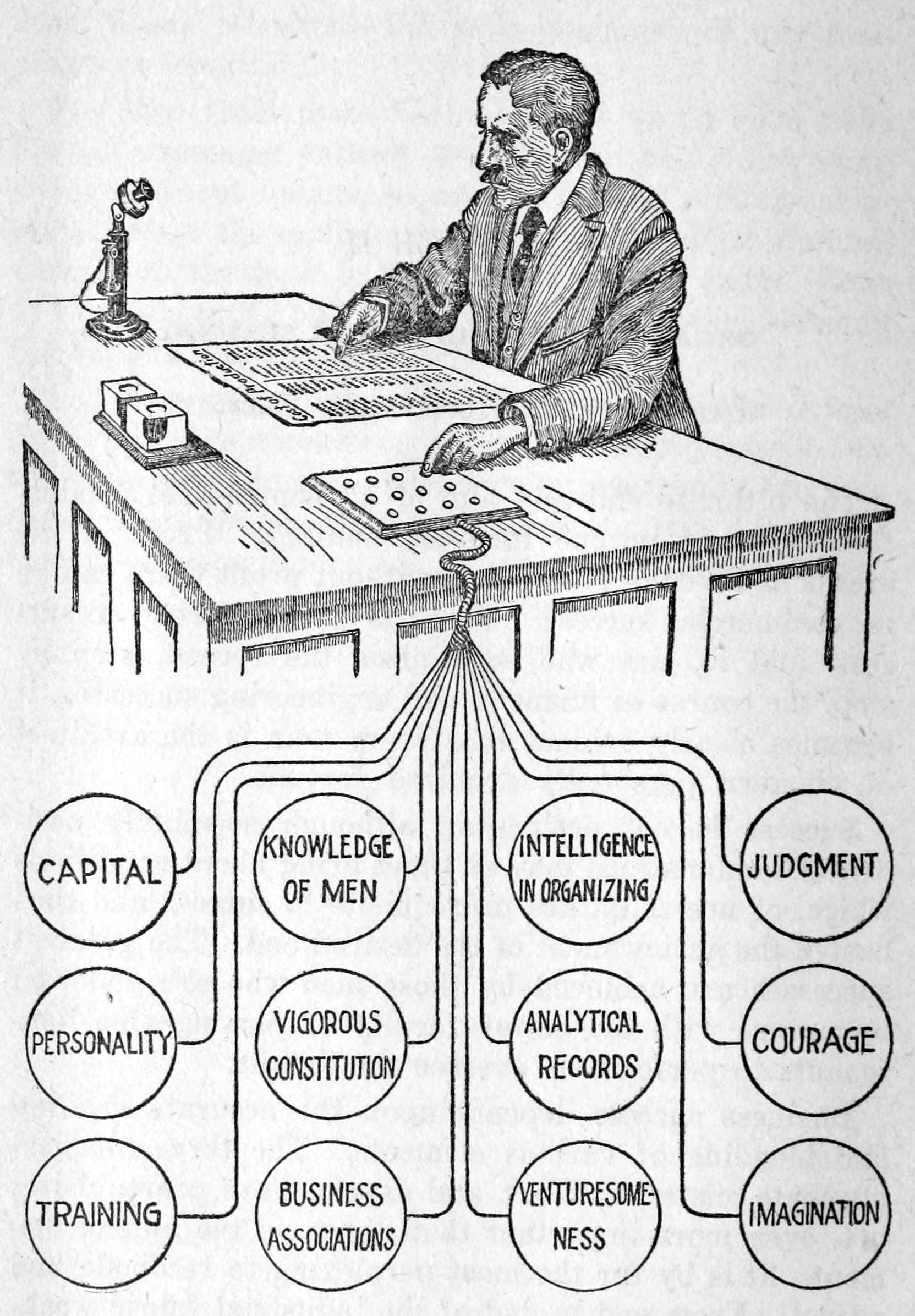
Aids to Factory Accounting, 1917.

Frank Erastus Webner (1865–1940s) was an American consulting cost accountant, and early management author, known for his work on cost accounting.

== Life and work ==
Webner had started working in the field of public accountancy in the 1890s. He obtained his Certified Public Accountant license for Illinois and Ohio in 1904, while working for the American Audit Company, Traction building, Cincinnati, Ohio.

Late in the 1900s Webner was employed by the American Mechanical Calculator Company. In the 1910s he became manager at J. Lee Nicholson & Co, and in the 1920 continued to work as Certified Public Accountant and specialist in cost accounting. Webner wrote a series of books on cost accounting and factory management, and frequent lectured before many of the largest universities in the country. In his days he was noted as one of the best-known certified public accountants in the country. He

At the turn of the 20th century, factory management was faced with the problem how overhead cost should be assigned to products. According to Levant & Zimnovitch "other problems also appeared at this time in the modelling of costing systems, such as how to distinguish between "production" cost centres working directly for production and "service provider" cost centres working for other centres, making it necessary to cascade the distribution of the charges related to these cost centres. Garner (1954) refers to Nicholson (1913) as well as to Webner (1917) and Taylor for how this problem was tackled."

== Work ==
=== Factory Accounting, 1917 ===
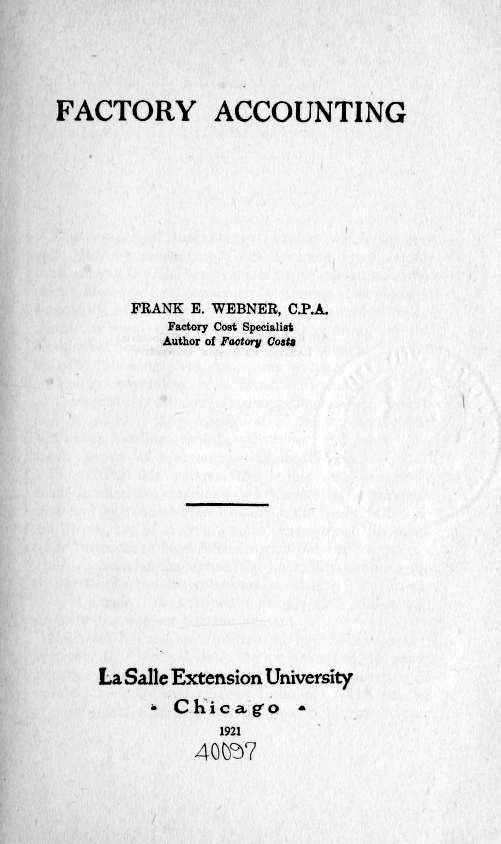
Factory Accounting, 1917

Frank E. Webner's 1917 book entitled Factory Accounting formed one of the texts on higher accountancy of the La Salle Extension University. As it is generally understood, the primary use to which all of these texts were to be put was correspondence instruction. A growing secondary consideration in offering them to the public was that they supplied a need, very real in some quarters, for satisfactory texts for School and collegiate instruction.

As should be the case, according to R.B. Kester (1917), to carry out the purpose indicated above, the volume was better adapted to its primary use, although providing a fairly satisfactory text for classroom use. Webner's broad experience in the field of practice marked him an authority as to what is needed for preparation for that line of work. Although he has been a frequent lecturer before many of the largest universities in the country, he does not realize, or, realizing, has not fully overcome all of the difficulties encountered when trying to present to students a difficult subject of which they know little from actual experience. However, in an effort to meet this difficulty the author has vitalized the book by an elaborate use of charts and illustrations which should bring home to the student the many intricacies of the subject if not, in all instances, clarifying the difficult points. The present day tendency to visualize everything by means of charts and graphs has led in a few places to a charting of things which do not lend themselves well to that method of presentation and so has cheapened the product. Fortunately, instances of this are not numerous in the present volume.

Webner's discussion of the human element is very good and calls attention to a subject which needs more attention than it generally receives. The content of the book is sufficiently indicated by the four main divisions:

- Organization,
- Controlling Records,
- Industrial Classification, and
- Production Elements.

One acquainted with Webner's earlier volume, Factory Costs, misses in the present volume much of the well thought out and philosophic treatment of the troublesome problem of burden application so ably presented there. The difference in scope and purpose of the two books accounts for its omission from the present volume. On the whole Factory Accounting is an able presentation of the subject of costs, is somewhat broader than the usual treatment, and should prove a satisfactory text for students.

== Selected publications ==
- Frank Erastus Webner. The Organization of a Cost Department. J.R. Dunlap, 1908.
- Webner, F. E. Factory costs, a work of reference for cost accountants and factory managers. 1911
- Webner, Frank Erastus. Factory Accounting. La Salle extension university, 1917; 1921; 1922.
- Webner, Frank Erastus. Factory Overhead. White Press Company, Incorporated, 1924.

Articles, a selection:

- Webner, F. E. "Taylor's Contribution to Cost Accounting: a Comment." The Accounting Historians Journal: 9–2.

Patents

- Webner, Frank E. "Mechanical calculator." U.S. Patent No. 997,483. 11 Jul. 1911.
