= Webner =

Webner is a surname and can refer to:

- Frank E. Webner, 19th century Pony Express rider.
- Frank E. Webner (1865-1940s) was an American consulting cost accountant
- Wolfgang Webner (born 1937), German former volleyball player
