= George P. Norton =

British accountant

George Pepler Norton (1858 – 1939) was a British accountant, known for the publication of his 1889 Textile Manufacturers' Bookkeeping, which contributed to the establishment of modern cost accounting.

== Life and work ==
Norton was born in Hampton Wick near London to George Pepler Norton and Eleanor Morris. He obtained a license and worked as chartered accountant. In 1889 he published his most known work Textile Manufacturers' Bookkeeping, which is considered one of the first comprehensive treatments of "the cost problems of a firm using the process cost method." This work ran in five edition, the fifth edition published in 1931. Solomons recalled that the importance of this work lies "in the fact that his book-keeping system for textile manufacturing, which dates back to 1889, clearly foreshadowed standard costing."

Norton made a significant contribution to the development of cost accounting. Chandra and Paperman (1976) specified, that "serious studies in cost accounting started only in the 1890s with the writings of Metcalfe, Garcke and Fells, Norton, Lewis, and later with Church, Nicholson and Clark. They were truly the pioneers who introduced new cost concepts like fixed and variable costs, standard cost, cost centers, relevant costs, etc. in the literature. The development of cost accounting in this period was undoubtedly slow. In addition, cost accounting tried to adapt itself within the framework of financial accounting. Part of the delay in the establishment of cost accounting concepts may be due to the tendency of cost accountants to keep the methods they had developed within their own firms secret."

== Family ==
Norton's children include Gilbert Paul Norton, David George Norton, and William John Norton, all educated at Gonville & Caius College, Cambridge.

== Selected publications ==
- Norton, George P. Textile Manufacturers' Bookkeeping for the Counting House. Mill and Warehouse, London: Simplin, Marshall, Hamilton, Kent, 1889; 4th ed. 1900.
- Norton, George P. Balancing for Expert Book-keepers: Second Thousand. (1894)
- Norton, George Pepler. Textile manufacturers' book-keeping for the counting house, mill and warehouse: Being a practical treatise, specially designed for the woollen and worsted and allied trades. Simpkin, Marshall, Hamilton, Kent & Co., 1900.
