= John F. D. Rohrbach =

American economist

John Francis Deems Rohrbach (1889 – Dec. 25, 1968) was an American business executive, known as co-author of Jerome Lee Nicholson's Cost accounting first published in 1919.

Born in New York City, Rohrbach obtained his degree at the New York City University. After graduation, he started his career as instructor in cost accounting at Columbia University, and got employed by J. Lee Nicholson and Company in the late 1910s, and eventually became partner in this consulting firm.

Later on Rohrbach became director of the Milford Rivet and Machine company in Connecticut, New York for some time. After that he joined the rubber company Raybestos-Manhattan Company, Inc. in Passaic, New Jersey. He started out as an accountant, when the firm was worth only $50,000. He got appointed as assistant to the president, became vice president and in 1939 director of the company. After his retirement he remained a chairman of the board of Raybestos.

== Selected publications ==
- Nicholson, Jerome Lee, and John Francis Deems Rohrbach. Cost accounting. New York: Ronald Press, 1919. 2nd ed. 1920; 3rd ed. 1922.
