= George Hillis Newlove =

American accounting scholar

George Hillis Newlove (December 16, 1893 – October 2, 1984) was an American accounting scholar, and Professor at the University of Texas, Department of Accounting and, College of Business Administration. his pioneering work in consolidation theory.

== Biography ==
Born in Crystal, North Dakota to Reverend Samuel Newlove and school teacher Vangie Hillis Newlove, Newlove wanted to follow in his mother's footsteps. He obtained his BA from Hamline University in 1914, his MA in Mathematics at the University of Minnesota in 1915, and his PhD at the University of Illinois in 1918. In 1918 he also obtained his Certified Public Accountant license for the State of North Carolina, and later also for the State of Illinois.

Newlove had started his academic career during his graduate study as instructor in accountancy at the University of Illinois. After graduation he served in the US Navy in World War I. From 1919 to 1923 he was lecturer in accountancy at the University of Washington, and from 1923 to 1928 Associate Professor at Johns Hopkins University. In 1928 he joined the University of Texas faculty, where he was Professor until his retirement.

Newlove wrote 27 books and numerous articles and is credited for his "pioneering work in consolidation theory, cost accounting, and... in the relationship of mathematics and accountancy. Generally considered one of the country's leading experts in consolidation theory and practice, he developed the original consolidation procedures used by the Treasury Department in its administration of the income tax."

== Selected publications ==
- Newlove, George Hillis. C. P. A. accounting, theory, auditing, and problems, The White Press Company, Inc., 1921; 3rd ed. 1930.
- Newlove, George Hillis, Cost accounts, 1922; 3rd ed. 1923.
- Newlove, George Hillis. Consolidated balance sheets. Ronald Press Company, 1926.
- Newlove, George Hillis, Charles Aubrey Smith, and John Arch White. Intermediate Accounting. Heath, 1948.
- Newlove, George Hillis, and Samuel Paul Garner. Elementary Cost Accounting. Heath, 1949.
- Newlove, George Hillis, and Samuel Paul Garner. Advanced Accounting. Vol. 1. Heath, 1951.
