= Samuel Paul Garner =

American accounting scholar

Samuel Paul Garner (August 15, 1910 – October 16, 1996) was an American accounting scholar, and Professor at the University of Alabama, known for his work "Evolution of cost accounting to 1925."

== Biography ==
Born in Yadkinville, North Carolina to Samuel W. and Ila Jane (Hoots) Garner, Garner at Duke University obtained his AB in 1932, and his AM in 1934. He then moved to the University of Texas at Austin where he obtained his PhD in 1940 under supervision of George Hillis Newlove. He was awarded an honorary degree by the Pusan National University, and by the University of Alabama in 1971.

After his graduation in 1939 Garner joined the Culverhouse School of Accountancy at the University of Alabama, where he would serve his entire academic career. He started out as faculty member, and was Dean of the College of Business from 1954 to 1971. He was consultant to the US Department of Education, to the Department of Defense and for the Department of State he conducted educational research in South America, Europe, Africa, and Asia. Garner was President of the American Accounting Association in 1951–52, and also served as President of the American Assembly of Collegiate Schools of Business in 1964–65.

Garner is characterized as "perhaps the last of the leaders of an age when the academic and professional community were driven to new levels of size and activity during the economic expansion of the post World War II period."

== Selected publications ==
- Newlove, George Hillis, and Samuel Paul Garner. Elementary Cost Accounting. Heath, 1949.
- Newlove, George Hillis, and Samuel Paul Garner. Advanced Accounting. Vol. 1. Heath, 1951.
- Garner, Samuel Paul. Evolution of cost accounting to 1925. Vol. 1. University of Alabama Press, 1976.

Articles, a selection:

- Garner, Samuel Paul. "Has cost accounting come of age." NACA Bulletin (November) (1951): 287–292.
