= List of Theta Nu Epsilon chapters =

Theta Nu Epsilon was an American sophomore collegiate class society that was founded at Wesleyan University in 1870 as a chapter of Skull and Bones. The society expanded into a new national organization that accepted members regardless of their fraternity status. In 1925, it reorganized as a traditional social fraternity.

The last legitimate chapter ceased operations during World War I in 1942. Because of early splits in the national organization, several unofficial national coalitions and rogue groups granted their own charters. As a result, many conflicts exist surrounding the actual founding dates and chapter designations, even at the institutions that had officially recognized groups.

The following list is composed of all known chapters of Theta Nu Epsilon, with active chapters indicated in bold and inactive chapters and institutions indicated in italics.

Chapter	Charter date and range	Institution	Location	Status	Ref.
Alpha	December 11, 1870 – 1912	Wesleyan University	Middletown, Connecticut	Withdrew	(Note: Chapter continued to operate as a local society called T.N.E.)
Beta	1872–1925	Syracuse University	Syracuse, New York	Inactive	
Gamma	1874–1920, 1925-1940	Union College	Schenectady, New York	Inactive	(Note: This chapter was a charter member of the reorganized Theta Nu Epsilon social fraternity.) (Note: Chapter was reformed in 1925 by Phi Nu Theta, established in 1920.)
Delta	1877–1905	Cornell University	Ithaca, New York	Inactive	
Epsilon	1878–1908	University of Rochester	Rochester, New York	Inactive	
Zeta	1879–1912	University of California	Berkeley, California	Withdrew	(Note: Chapter founded Skull & Keys (local) for seniors.)
Eta	1880–1923	Colgate University	Hamilton, New York	Inactive	
Theta	1881–1915	Kenyon College	Gambier, Ohio	Inactive	
Iota	1881–1921	Western Reserve University	Cleveland, Ohio	Inactive	
Kappa	1882–1912	Hamilton College	Kirkland, New York	Inactive	
Lambda	1881–1940	Rensselaer Polytechnic Institute	Troy, New York	Merged (**ΑΚΠ**)	(Note: Chapter was reformed in 1925 by Theta Nu Epsilon, established in 1882.) (Note: Withdrew and became a chapter of Alpha Kappa Pi.)
Lambda Deuteron	1882–1908	Williams College	Williamstown, Massachusetts	Inactive	
Mu	1883–1934	Stevens Institute of Technology	Hoboken, New Jersey	Inactive	(Note: Chapter was reformed in 1925 by Chi Sigma Delta, established in 1919.)
Nu	1884–1925	Lafayette College	Easton, Pennsylvania	Inactive	
Beta Beta	1885–1914	Ohio Wesleyan University	Delaware, Ohio	Inactive	
Xi (First)	1885–1904	Amherst College	Amherst, Massachusetts	Inactive	
Omicron	1887–1924	Allegheny College	Meadville, Pennsylvania	Inactive	
Omicron Deuteron	1887–1907	Lehigh University	Bethlehem, Pennsylvania	Inactive	
Pi Pi	1887–1925	Dickinson College	Carlisle, Pennsylvania	Inactive	
Pi	1888–1903, 1927–1940	Pennsylvania State College	State College, Pennsylvania	Inactive	(Note: Chapter was reformed by Omega Mu Rho, established in 1924.)
Rho (see Kappa Theta)	1888–1919	University of Pennsylvania	Philadelphia, Pennsylvania	Reestablished	
Sigma	1889–1914	New York University	New York City, New York	Inactive	
Pi Chi	1890–1906	University of Toronto	Toronto, Ontario, Canada	Inactive	(Note: Chapter operated as Theta Nu Epsilon but is considered illegitimate, as it was not chartered by Alpha or the successive national society or national fraternity.)
Psi Omega	1890–1909	University of the South	Sewanee, Tennessee	Inactive	
Tau	1891–1910	University of Wooster	Wooster, Ohio	Inactive	
Beta Lambda	1891–1911	Mount Union College	Alliance, Ohio	Inactive	
Phi	1892–1914	Rutgers University	New Brunswick, New Jersey	Withdrew	
Upsilon	1892–1916	University of Michigan	Ann Arbor, Michigan	Inactive	
Chi	1893–1925	Dartmouth College	Hanover, New Hampshire	Inactive	
Psi (see Alpha Eta)	1893–1914	Ohio State University	Columbus, Ohio	Reestablished	
Psi Deuteron	June 1893–19xx ?	Northwestern University	Evanston, Illinois	Inactive	
Alpha Psi	1893–1905	University of North Carolina at Chapel Hill	Chapel Hill, North Carolina	Inactive	
Alpha Alpha	1894–1913	Bowdoin College	Brunswick, Maine	Inactive	
Delta Sigma	1894–1925	University of Kansas	Lawrence, Kansas	Inactive	
Alpha Gamma	1914–1930	Duke University	Durham, North Carolina	Inactive	
Alpha Delta	1893–1925	Illinois Wesleyan University	Bloomington, Illinois	Inactive	
Alpha Sigma	1890–1912	Washington and Lee University	Lexington, Virginia	Inactive	
Alpha Eta (see Alpha Lambda)	1894–1914	University of Nebraska	Lincoln, Nebraska	Reestablished	(Note: Sometimes called the Lambda Lambda chapter.) (Note: The chapter was suppressed by the university administration in 1951 but continued to operate sub rosa as a new group called Pi Xi. It was reestablished by a prominent alumni in 1957.)
Omega	1894–1913	Swarthmore College	Swarthmore, Pennsylvania	Inactive	
Delta Delta	1895–1923	University of Maine	Orono, Maine	Withdrew	(Note: Chapter became the Senior Skull Honor Society (local).)
Epsilon Epsilon	1896–1913	Case School of Applied Science	Cleveland, Ohio	Inactive	
Alpha Theta	1895–1924, 2003–c. 2008	University of Missouri	Columbia, Missouri	Inactive	
Alpha Iota	1895–1913, 1924–1928	Harvard University	Cambridge, Massachusetts	Inactive	(Note: Chapter created the Phoenix Club as its public arm in 1902, which split from the fraternity in 1912. It is now known as The Phoenix – S K Club.)
Beta Deuteron	1895–xxxx ?	Hampden–Sydney College	Hampden Sydney, Virginia	Inactive	
Alpha Pi	1895-1908	Middlebury College	Middlebury, Vermont	Inactive	
Delta Rho	1895–1923	Northwestern University	Evanston, Illinois	Inactive	(Note: Chapter also called Kappa Kappa.)
Delta Tau	1895–1923	University of Chicago Professional Education	Chicago, Illinois	Inactive	
Pi Phi	1895–1910	University of Virginia	Charlottesville, Virginia	Inactive	(Note: Chaper withdrew and operated as a local organization into the early 2000s.)
Mu Epsilon	1896–1902	Washington & Jefferson College	Washington, Pennsylvania	Inactive	
	1896–1897	Wittenberg University	Springfield, Ohio	Inactive	
Gamma Kappa	1897–1902	City University of New York	New York City, New York	Inactive	
Gamma Xi	1897–1902	Bethany College	Bethany, West Virginia	Inactive	
Zeta Zeta	1897–1912	Roanoke College	Salem, Virginia	Inactive	
Gamma Gamma	1898–1910	Trinity College	Hartford, Connecticut	Inactive	
Alpha Zeta	1898-1925	University of Vermont	Burlington, Vermont	Inactive	
Kappa Gamma	1898–1914	University of Vermont Medical School	Burlington, Vermont	Inactive	
Alpha Rho (see Beta Nu)	1898–xxxx ?	University of South Carolina	Columbia, South Carolina	Reestablished	
Alpha Rho Deuteron (1)	1898–1901	Central University of Kentucky	Richmond, Kentucky	Moved	(Note: Chapter moved when the university merged with Central College in 1901)
Kappa Beta	1899–1929	Bucknell University	Lewisburg, Pennsylvania	Inactive	
	1899–1905	Susquehanna University	Selinsgrove, Pennsylvania	Inactive	
	1899–1940	Washington University in St. Louis	St. Louis, Missouri	Inactive	
Alpha Nu	1900–1907	Tulane University	New Orleans, Louisiana	Inactive	
Alpha Upsilon	1900–1912	University of Kentucky	Lexington, Kentucky	Inactive	
	1900–1905	Baylor University	Waco, Texas	Inactive	
Beta Upsilon (Mu Beta)	1900–1912	Brown University	Providence, Rhode Island	Inactive	
Princeton	1900–1902	Princeton University	Princeton, New Jersey	Inactive	
	1900–1923	University of Pittsburgh	Pittsburgh, Pennsylvania	Inactive	
	1900–1900, 1948–xxxx ?	University of Nevada	Reno, Nevada	Inactive	
	1900–1900	University of Cincinnati	Cincinnati, Ohio	Inactive	
	1900–1923	Bates College	Lewiston, Maine	Inactive	
Alpha Rho Deuteron (2)	1901–1940	Centre College	Danville, Kentucky	Inactive	(Note: Chapter moved from Central University of Kentucky when the two colleges merged in 1901.)
Delta Epsilon (also called Zeta Zeta)	1901–1924	Indiana University	Bloomington, Indiana	Inactive	
Alpha Xi	1901–1911	Oglethorpe University	Brookhaven, Georgia	Inactive	
Alpha Omicron	1901–1910	Cumberland University	Lebanon, Tennessee	Inactive	
Alpha Omega	1901–1914	Columbia University	New York City, New York	Inactive	
Invictus	1901–1923, 1923–1994, 2008–20xx ?	Vanderbilt University	Nashville, Tennessee	Inactive	
Sigma Alpha	1902–1910	Westminster College	New Wilmington, Pennsylvania	Inactive	
Beta Eta	1902–1906	Muhlenberg College	Allentown, Pennsylvania	Inactive	
Alpha Epsilon	1902–1913	University of Colorado	Boulder, Colorado	Inactive	
Alpha Rho	1902–1914, 19xx ?–1940s	University of Alabama	Tuscaloosa, Alabama	Withdrew	(Note: Starting in the 1940s, this chapter was referred to as The Machine.)
Alpha Tau	1902–1913	Iowa Wesleyan University	Mount Pleasant, Iowa	Inactive	
Beta Zeta	1902–1904	Nebraska Wesleyan University	Lincoln, Nebraska	Inactive	
Omicron Omicron	1903–1905, 1923–1942	Ohio Northern University	Ada, Ohio	Merged (**ΑΚΠ**)	(Note: Withdrew and became the Ohio Alpha chapter of Sigma Pi Epsilon. Chapter was reformed in 1923 by Theta Nu Epsilon, established in 1903.) (Note: Chapter was reformed in 1925 by Theta Nu Epsilon, established in 1903.)
Pi Pi	1903–1925	Dickinson College of Law	Carlisle, Pennsylvania	Inactive	
Beta Nu (see Alpha Rho)	1903–1910	University of South Carolina	Columbia, South Carolina	Inactive	
Beta Omicron	1903–1914	Colby College	Waterville, Maine	Inactive	
Lambda Sigma	1903–1915	Yale University	New Haven, Connecticut	Inactive	
Beta Mu	1904–1909	Emory University	Atlanta, Georgia	Inactive	
Beta Xi	1904–1914	DePauw University	Greencastle, Indiana	Inactive	
Beta Psi	1904–1913	University of Florida	Gainesville, Florida	Inactive	
Omega Nu	1904–1914	University of Maryland	College Park, Maryland	Inactive	
Zeta Phi	1904–1914	Boston University	Boston, Massachusetts	Inactive	
Zeta Phi	1904–1914	Massachusetts Institute of Technology	Cambridge, Massachusetts	Inactive	
Sigma Rho	1904–1913	University of Georgia	Athens, Georgia	Inactive	
	1904–1940	Kentucky State University	Frankfort, Kentucky	Inactive	
Sigma Tau	1904–1923	University of Maryland Medical College	Baltimore, Maryland	Inactive	
Omega Kappa	1905–1913	Baltimore Medical College	Baltimore, Maryland	Inactive	(Note: The college merged with the University of Maryland Medical College in 1913.)
Alpha Phi	1906–1912	University of Mississippi	Oxford, Mississippi	Inactive	
Kappa Kappa (see Xi Second)	1907–1914	University of Texas	Austin, Texas	Withdrew	(Note: Became Tejas Club (local).)
Psi Psi	1907–19xx ?, 1930–1935	Iowa State University	Ames, Iowa	Inactive	(Note: Chapter was reformed by Tau Gamma Nu, established in 1915.)
Alpha Delta	1907–1925	Illinois Wesleyan University	Bloomington, Illinois	Inactive	
Kappa Rho	1907–1925	Baltimore College of Dental Surgery	Baltimore, Maryland	Inactive	
	1908–1912	Randolph–Macon College	Ashland, Virginia	Inactive	
Beta Pi	1908–1914	Davidson College	Davidson, North Carolina	Inactive	
Sigma Phi	1908–1918	University of Tennessee College of Medicine	Memphis, Tennessee	Inactive	
Gamma Beta	1909–1928	Jefferson Medical College	Philadelphia, Pennsylvania	Inactive	
	1909–1925, 1932–1939	George Washington University	Washington, D.C.	Inactive	
Epsilon Deuteron	1909–1921	University of Rochester Alumni	Rochester, New York	Inactive	
Nu Mu	1909–1913	Auburn University	Auburn, Alabama	Inactive	
	1909–1923	University of Washington	Seattle, Washington	Inactive	
	1909–1929	University of Denver	Denver, Colorado	Inactive	
Alpha Alpha	1910–1923	Purdue University	West Lafayette, Indiana	Inactive	
Zeta Zeta	1910–1917	University of Wyoming	Laramie, Wyoming	Inactive	
Eta Eta	1910–1914	University of Massachusetts	Amherst, Massachusetts	Inactive	
Iota Iota	1910–1915	University of Wisconsin	Madison, Wisconsin	Inactive	
Rho Rho	1910–1913	Norwich University	Northfield, Vermont	Inactive	
	1910–1923, 1928–1928, 1934–1946	University of Oregon	Eugene, Oregon	Inactive	
	1910–1914	Niagara University	Lewiston, New York	Inactive	
	1910–1912	Gettysburg College	Gettysburg, Pennsylvania	Inactive	
	1910–1912	Franklin & Marshall College	Lancaster, Pennsylvania	Inactive	
	1910–1923	Colorado School of Mines	Golden, Colorado	Inactive	
Omega Omega	1910–1915	Georgia Tech	Atlanta, Georgia	Inactive	
Alpha Chi	1910–1924	University of Illinois		Inactive	
Omicron Omega	1910–1916	St. Lawrence University	Canton, New York	Inactive	
Theta Theta	1911–1914	West Virginia University	Morgantown, West Virginia	Inactive	
Mu Mu	1911–1914	Stanford University	Stanford, California	Inactive	
Nu Nu	1911–1931, 1929–1931	Marquette University	Milwaukee, Wisconsin	Inactive	(Note: Chapter reformed in 1925 by Theta Nu Epsilon, established in 1911. It went inactive when most of its members graduated. After reforming, the chapter was suspended in 1931. It operated until 1935 as an independent local organization with the same name.)
Xi Xi	1911–19xx ?, 1928–1933	University of Louisville	Louisville, Kentucky	Inactive	(Note: Chapter was reformed by Omega Rho, established in 1925.)
Sigma Sigma	1911–1915	Medical College of Virginia	Richmond, Virginia	Inactive	
	1911–19xx ?	Denison University	Granville, Ohio	Inactive	
	1912–1940	Johns Hopkins University	Baltimore, Maryland	Inactive	
Upsilon Upsilon	1912–1940	New York University Washington Square	Manhattan, New York	Inactive	(Note: Chapter reformed in 1925 by Theta Nu Epsilon, established in 1912. It went inactive during World War II when its members were drafted or enlisted.)
Phi Phi	1912–1925	University of Arkansas	Fayetteville, Arkansas	Inactive	
Chi Chi	1913–1925	University of Iowa	Iowa City, Iowa	Inactive	
Tau Tau	1914–1925	Baker University	Baldwin City, Kansas	Inactive	
Alpha Beta	1914–1918, 1925–1928	University at Buffalo	Buffalo, New York	Inactive	(Note: Chapter was reformed by Theta Nu Epsilon, established in 1914.)
Alpha Gamma	1914–1924	Duke University	Durham, North Carolina	Inactive	
Alpha Epsilon	1915–1925	University of South Dakota	Vermillion, South Dakota	Inactive	
Alpha Eta	1916–1925	Rush Medical College	Chicago, Illinois	Inactive	
Alpha Kappa	1916–1923	Northwestern University Dental School	Evanston, Illinois	Inactive	
	1916–1929	Oregon State University	Corvallis, Oregon	Inactive	
Alpha Lambda (see Alpha Eta)	1917–1925	University of Nebraska	Lincoln, Nebraska	Inactive	
Beta Gamma	1921–1925	Chicago College of Dental Surgery	Chicago, Illinois	Inactive	
Beta Epsilon	1917–1925	Oklahoma State University	Stillwater, Oklahoma	Inactive	
Delta Iota	1919–1925	University of Illinois Professional Schools		Inactive	
Delta Beta	1922–1925	Lehigh University	Bethlehem, Pennsylvania	Inactive	
Beta Delta	1921–1925	University of Chicago	Chicago, Illinois	Inactive	
Beta Iota	1921–1924	Drake University	Des Moines, Iowa	Inactive	
Beta Kappa	1921–1923	Millikin University	Decatur, Illinois	Inactive	
Beta Sigma	1921–1925	Kansas State University	Manhattan, Kansas	Inactive	
Beta Chi	1921–1924	University of Minnesota	Minneapolis, Minnesota	Inactive	
Delta Chi	1922–1925	University of Oklahoma	Norman, Oklahoma	Inactive	
	c. 1922–c. 1955	University of Oregon	Eugene, Oregon	Inactive	(Note: Chapter was sub rosa in violation of both university and fraternity policies.)
	1923–1929	Colorado State University	Fort Collins, Colorado	Inactive	
	1923–1923	University of Northern Colorado	Greeley, Colorado	Inactive	
Chi Alpha	1923–1949; October 25, 2005 – 20xx ?	University of New Mexico	Albuquerque, New Mexico	Inactive	
	1923–1940	Colorado College	Colorado Springs, Colorado	Inactive	
	1923–1940	William Jewell College	Liberty, Missouri	Inactive	
	1923–1940	Michigan State University	East Lansing, Michigan	Inactive	
	1923–1940	Washington State University	Pullman, Washington	Inactive	
Delta Lambda	1923–1928	Kansas City Dental College	Kansas City, Missouri	Inactive	(Note: Chapter was reformed in 1925 by Theta Nu Epsilon, established in 1922. However, the college never recognized the chapter. However, the national fraternity withdrew its charter when it decided to only be associated with four-year undergraduate institutions. A chapter continued to operate illegally (with the national fraternity's authority) at the University of Missouri, Kansas City, the successor of the dental school, for at least 80 years.)
Delta Pi	1924–1934	University of California	Berkeley, California	Inactive	(Note: Chapter was reformed by Dwight Way, established in 1900.)
	1924–1940	Canisius College	Buffalo, New York	Inactive	
Kappa Rho	1924–1929	University of Maryland, Baltimore	Baltimore, Maryland	Inactive	
	1925–1934	Missouri School of Mines and Metallurgy	Rolla, Missouri	Inactive	
	1925–1929	Drury College	Springfield, Missouri	Inactive	
	1925–1925	Clarkson University	Potsdam, New York	Inactive	
	1925–1940	Creighton University	Omaha, Nebraska	Inactive	
	1927–1929	Mississippi State University	Mississippi State, Mississippi	Inactive	
	1928–1929	Miami University	Oxford, Ohio	Inactive	
Delta Phi	1927–1930	Lombard College	Galesburg, Illinois	Inactive	(Note: Chapter was formed by Omega Tau Upsilon. It went inactive when the college closed.)
	c. 1927–1933	Lincoln and Lee University	Kansas City, Missouri	Inactive	(Note: The university merged into the University of Kansas City in 1933.)
Mu Mu	May 1928–1933	Coe College	Cedar Rapids, Iowa	Inactive	(Note: Chapter was formed from Sigma Phi Delta (local), established in 1916. Later, it withdrew and reformed Sigma Phi Delta which dissolved in 1934.)
Pi Pi	1928–1934	University of Illinois	Urbana, Illinois	Inactive	(Note: Chapter was formed from Kappa Tau Beta, established in 1922.)
Alpha Eta (see Psi)	1928–1931	Ohio State University	Columbus, Ohio	Inactive	(Note: Chapter was reformed by Delta Kappa Theta, established in 1921.)
	1928–1933	University of Missouri, Kansas City	Kansas City, Missouri	Inactive	(Note: This chapter formed from the remnants of the Delta Lambda chapter and operated independently of the national fraternity.)
	1928–1929	University of Montana	Missoula, Montana	Inactive	
	1928–1929	University of North Dakota	Grand Forks, North Dakota	Inactive	
	1928–1929	Montana State University	Bozeman, Montana	Inactive	
	1928–1929	University of Utah	Salt Lake City, Utah	Inactive	
	1928–1929	Whitman College	Walla Walla, Washington	Inactive	
Xi (Second) (see Kappa Kappa)	November 1, 1928 – August 1929	University of Texas	Austin, Texas	Inactive	(Note: In January 1929, the university's honor councils placed 109 students on social probation for attending a chapter dance; at the time, the Theta Nu Epsilon was an unrecognized ribbon club. In August 1929, the university's board of regents established new policies for fraternities and sororities, including abolishing the ribbon societies Theta Nu Epsilon and Skull and Bones.)
Alpha Mu	April 7, 1929 – 1936	Southwestern, The College of the Mississippi Valley	Memphis, Tennessee	Inactive	(Note: Chapter was formed from Tau Delta Gamma (local), established in 1927.)
	1946–1946	University of Southern California	Los Angeles, California	Inactive	
	1949 –1949	Wichita State University	Wichita, Kansas	Inactive	
	1949–1949	University of Arizona	Tucson, Arizona	Inactive	
Kappa Theta (see Rho)	1997–xxxx ?	University of Pennsylvania	Philadelphia, Pennsylvania	Inactive	
