= Edward P. Moxey =

American accountant and academic (1881–1943)

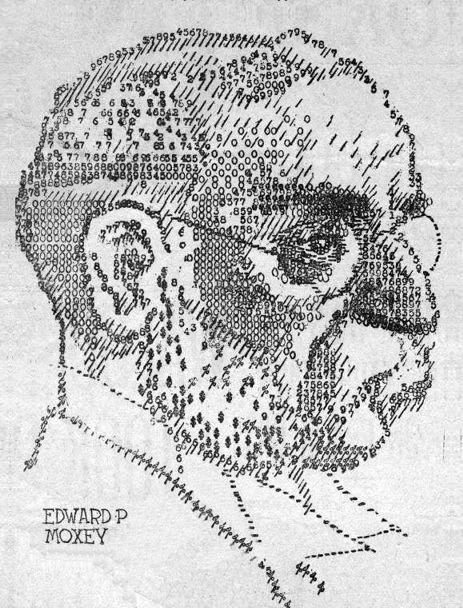
Edward P. Moxey

Edward Preston Moxey Jr. (October 2, 1881 – April 6, 1943 ) was an American accountant, and the first Professor of Accounting at the Wharton School of Finance and Commerce at the University of Pennsylvania. He is known for his early works on cost-keeping in factories, which describe the elementary principles of cost accounting.

== Biography ==
Born in Philadelphia to Edward P. and Mary Ann, Moxey was named after his father. He was a banker, broker, businessman and accountant, had founded the Edward P. Moxey accountancy firm, and had published the 1881 book, entitled "Fluctuations of the New York stock market, 1870–1880." Moxey obtained his BS in economics in 1904, his MA in 1906, and his PhD at the University of Pennsylvania in 1909. Subsequently, he obtained his Certified Public Accountants license in 1913 for the state of Pennsylvania.

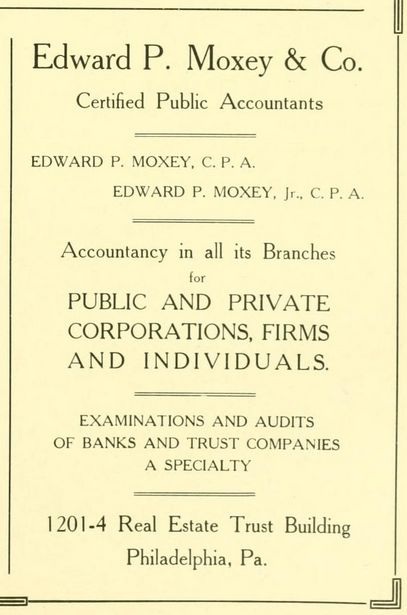
Business ad, 1912

After his graduation Moxey joined the accountancy firm Edward P. Moxey & Co, where he became a partner in 1911. After his father's death in 1915, he took over the prestigious accounting firm. The firm would eventually merge into Coopers & Lybrand in 1962. Moxey had started at the University of Pennsylvania as an Assistant Instructor in 1904, became an instructor in 1907, Assistant Professor in 1910, and Full Professor in 1915. At the Wharton School of Finance and Commerce he was the first to be appointed Professor of Accounting, and the first chairman of its Accounting department.

Moxey was co-founder of the National Association of Cost Accountants, board member and co-founder of its Philadelphia chapter and its president in 1929–31.

Moxey's son, Edward P. Moxey, III, graduated from Wharton in 1930 and followed his father's and grandfather's footsteps and became a third generation CPA. He worked for Philco-Ford Corporation, later Ford Aerospace, and taught at Temple University.

== Work ==
=== Accounting at the Wharton School ===
Moxey had joined the Wharton School faculty in the early 1900s. A 1904 article in the Bulletin of the American Institute of Banking reports, that under Moxey Jr., a class in bookkeeping was organized for those without previous experience. The class completed the first set of books in the elementary work, and at the beginning of the second half would take up first year accounting, to be prepared to take advanced accounting in the second year.

The teaching in accounting had been organized within the Wharton School since its initiation. Joseph Wharton had agreed upon this in its initial plan, which had stated that "one professor or instructor of accounting or bookkeeping [should] teach the simplest and most practical forms of bookkeeping for housekeepers, for private individuals, for commercial and banking firms, for manufacturing establishments, and for banks; also, the modes of keeping accounts by executors, trustees, and assignees, by the officials of towns and cities, as well as by the several departments of a State or National Government; also, the routine of business between a bank and a customer."

In his second year at the Wharton School (1905–06) Moxey taught three regular accounting courses, entitled "Elementary Accounting", "Accounting Systems", and "C.P.A. Problems."

=== Accounting Systems (1911) ===
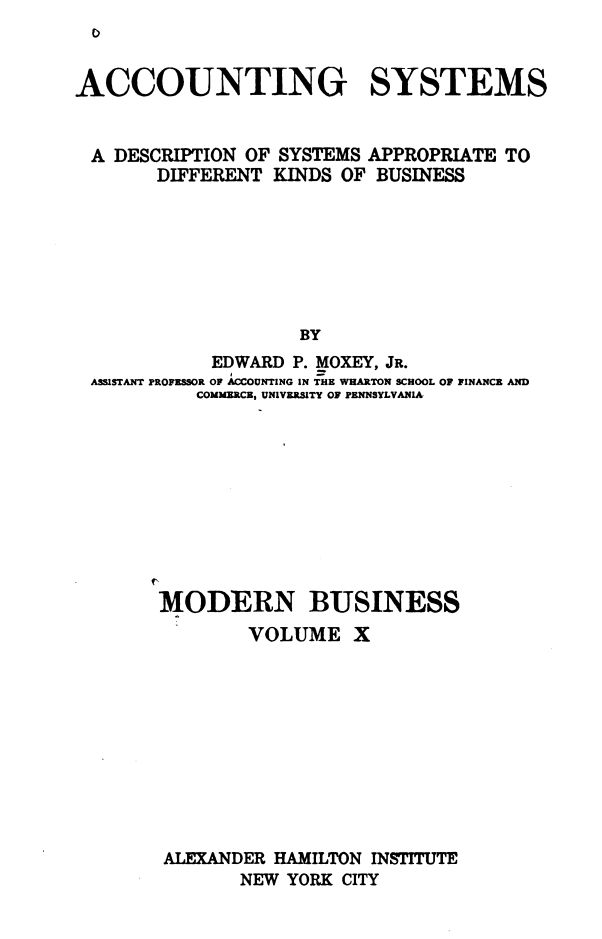
Title page, 1911

In 1911 Moxey's first book Accounting Systems was published by the Alexander Hamilton Institute. This work was part of a twelve-volume series on Modem Business, and was written for a particular clientele. The series is designed for home study, partly as the basis for correspondence work, but more generally used as a comprehensive treatment of business organization and methods for persons studying by themselves without personal intercourse with an instructor.

In a 1912 review by Henry Rand Hatfield in Journal of Political Economy, Hatfield explained, that "for such it would seem an almost indispensable feature that there be furnished a convenient, yet fairly comprehensive, list of collateral references. Even in the college classroom, where text can readily be amplified by suggestions or criticisms of the instructor, the use of collateral references is well-nigh universal. Much more important is it that the isolated student should be encouraged to compare other, perhaps conflicting, views. Furthermore, the interested student constantly desires to branch out and make a more intensive study of some topic, touched upon in a general treatise but in such a work necessarily given but scant attention."

In the 1912 review Hatfield further explained, that the subject matter of the volumes is in general very well presented. Moxey, in the volume on accounting systems, presents in some considerable detail general systems of accounts adapted respectively to the needs of building and loan associations, life and fire insurance companies, department stores, gas companies, railroads, street railways, and municipalities. To these are added chapters on bank accounting by Howard Jefferson, on brewery accounting by Otto A. Grundmann, and on accounts of executors and administrators by Harold D. Greeley. Hatfield commented, that "if any criticism is to be made it might be that somewhat too much attention is given to details of forms, and too little emphasis is laid on the particular features which logically require differently ordered accounting systems."

And furthermore Hatfield (1912) noted, that "it seems almost gratuitous to print forms of a customer's check, a bank draft, and a deposit ticket. The purchase of supplies is not particularly different in a department store from that in a gas company, or a street railway, so there is some repetition in describing the handling of purchases in each of these institutions. Voucher payments and pay-rolls are not referred to in the discussion of department stores, but are described in connection with gas companies as if particularly connected with the latter industry. The chapter on municipal accounts is the least satisfactory; that on department stores is particularly clear and interesting."

=== Principles of Factory Cost Keeping (1913) ===
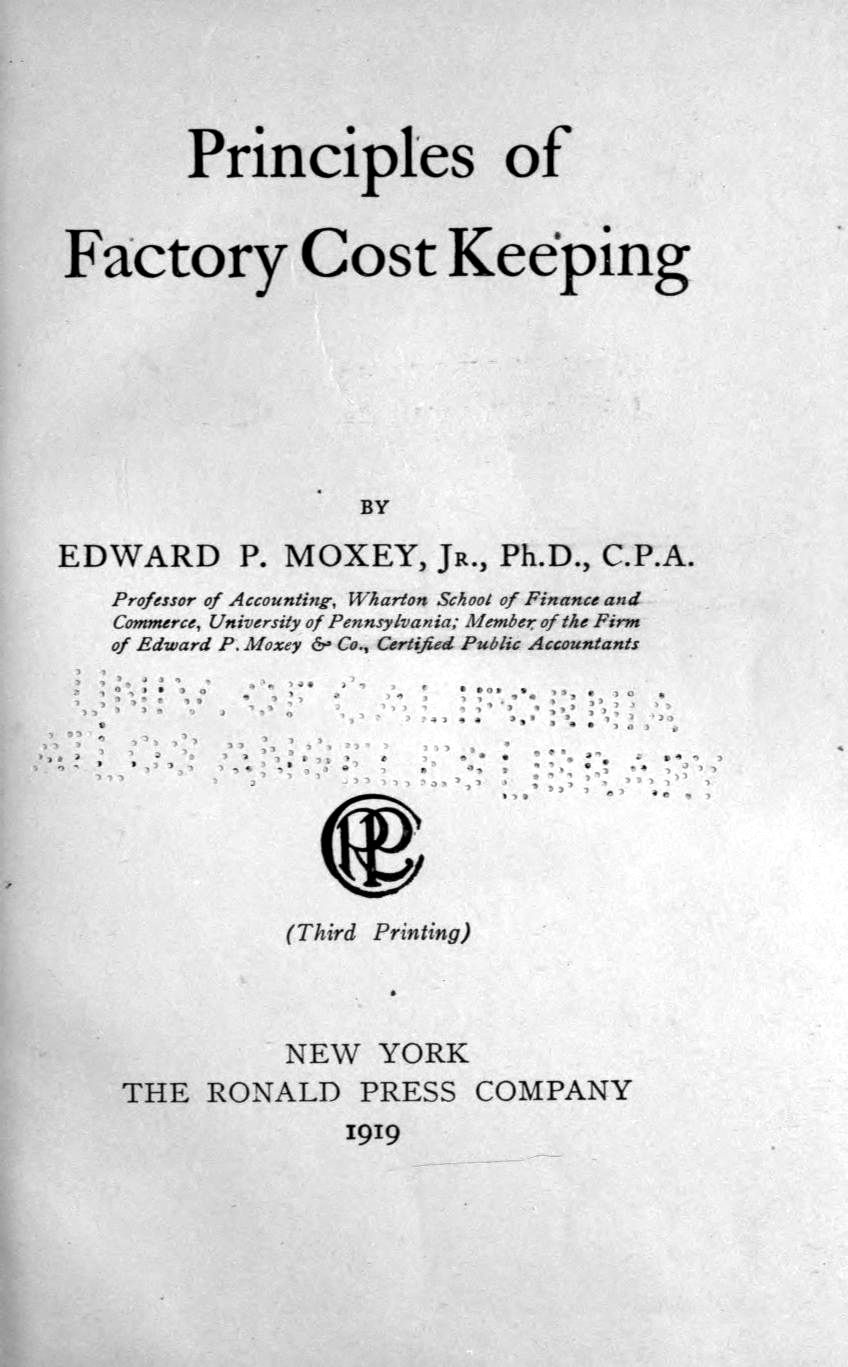
Title page, 1913

In the preface of the 1913 "Principles of Factory Cost Keeping", Moxey started to explain, that the literature in which an activity finds its expression depends upon the interest in, and the development of, that activity. It was according to Moxey therefore not surprising to find that there was comparatively little literature on accounting in his days. Charles Waldo Haskins had said:

"The literature of accounting is virtually in its infancy, awaiting the fostering care of cultured authorship."

Haskins' statement was particularly applicable to the subject of cost accounting. Although many valuable articles had been written on different phases of this subject, and while excellent books on costs had appeared from time to time, it was a notable fact that such articles and such books have been either of a highly technical character, or otherwise treating of special systems of costs as actually installed and used by certain manufacturing plants.

As a result of this, according to Moxey, in his day there existed in many minds the idea that the principles of cost accounting were more or less mysterious and vague, and that the subject is one for the expert, only to be understood after years of study and experience. This idea is due largely to the lack of a clear and simple presentation of the principles upon which cost accounting rests; and it is to supply this need that the present book has been prepared.

Moxey admitted that the use of diagrams in illustrating the principles of cost accounting is not new. They were used quite successfully in the early 1880s by Emile Garcke and John Manger Fells in their book "Factory Accounts"; but the idea had been further developed by Moxey, and had been made applicable to conditions of his day.

Moxey ended his preface by stating that "the book offered to those interested along cost accounting lines, with the hope that it may help to a clearer understanding of the true aims of this important branch of accounting science."

=== The purpose of cost keeping ===
Moxey (1913) explained that there are two reasons which warrant the keeping of cost records and which justify the consequent expense involved.

1) Cost keeping furnishes the manufacturer with accurate and reliable information concerning the costs incurred in production, enabling him to fix prices and bid intelligently against others in the same field.
2) Through his cost accounting department the manufacturer is enabled to detect, locate, and eliminate waste or leakage in materials, labor, and other expenses incident to production.

=== Analysis of General Ledger ===
A system of accounting, according to Moxey, should go beyond the elementary presentation of facts to furnish information sufficient and accurate enough for the requirements of modern business. Some classes of expense are not of a temporary nature. The use of certain articles in production such as machinery extends over a series of years. It is not right to charge the original cost of such purchases to profit and loss in the period in which they are made, for they will figure in the manufacture of hundreds of subsequent lots of goods. In his Principles of Factory Cost Keeping (1913) Moxey proposes a system, which is based on the following basic distinctions:

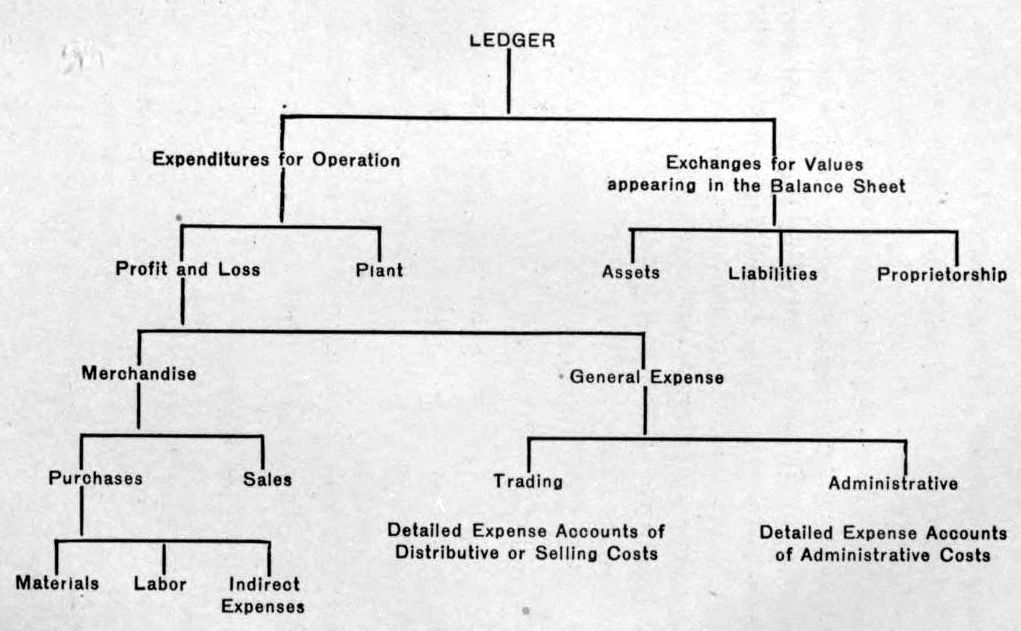
Analysis of General Ledger, 1919

- Temporary and Permanent Expenditures : For cost accounting purposes, therefore, a first distinction considering expenditures only for the present must be made between expenditures for assets of a more permanent type generally known as fixed assets, and comprehended in the term "Plant" and those of a more or less temporary character, known as "Profit and Loss" items, or those comprehended in the general class of "Nominal Accounts."
- Classification of Merchandising Expenditures : Following this a more detailed classification becomes desirable. Taking a merchandising concern for the sake of illustration, we find that "Profit and Loss" expenditure is divided into two parts, the distinguishing feature being the difference between payments for that which is dealt in, classified under the heading "Merchandise", and payments for services and other items necessary to the proper conduct of the business, known as "General Expense."

A further subdivision of "General Expense" must then be made to show the items which make up its total amount. Two subheadings, known respectively as "Trading Expense" and "Administrative Expense", are usually employed. The former covers the detailed expense accounts which go to make up the cost of distributing the goods, including salesmen's salaries and expenses, rent of the store in the case of a merchandising house, costs of advertising and of the delivery service; while the latter includes those accounts which show the cost of managing the financial and business affairs of the concern, including all administrative salaries and general office expense, such as, for example, office supplies.

On the other hand, "Merchandise", being entirely too general in its character, is also subdivided. The first distinction is that made between purchases and sales. The sales may also be divided into classified sales accounts, while in the division of the purchases we find the first signs of detailed costs.

=== Relation Between Cost and General Books ===
In factory accounting more cost books are being used corresponding to the different divisions of the factory: There are the "Stores Ledger", the "Cost Ledger", and the "Stock Ledger." The relation of these cost books to the general commercial books is shown by the diagram.

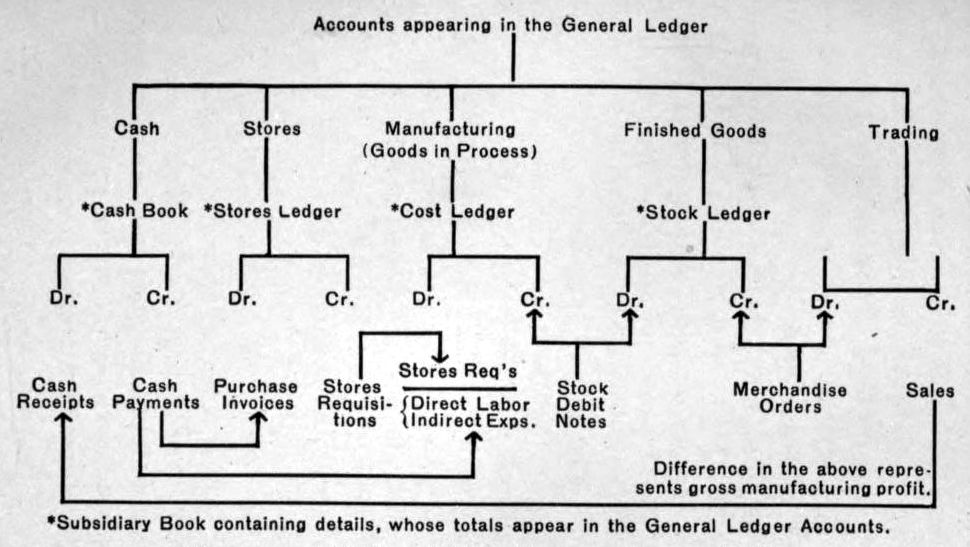
Relation of Cost Books to Commercial Books, 1919

In order to understand the diagram and illustrate the operation of the books, it can be presumed that a certain sum of money is disbursed for the purchase of materials, labor, and other supplies and services connected with the production of the goods. This, in the ordinary journal form, would be represented by an entry, whereby materials, labor, and/or indirect expense are directed to cash. By this entry the accounts costing the business value are debited, and the account which has produced value, viz., cash, is credited.

Now Moxey explained, that in his days in a small business this method of accomplishing the result might be satisfactory. In a large business, however, there are numerous transactions involving these accounts which occur every business day. If these were to be separately recorded in the journal, the work required and the expense involved would be out of all proportion to the results obtained. To avoid this labor, transactions of a similar nature, when there are many of them, are brought together in one subsidiary record, and the totals only are posted to the ledger. Thus there is usually a book devoted to the detailed recording of cash receipts and payments, while the general ledger cash account is concerned merely with the totals. Likewise the "Stores Ledger" contains a number of accounts usually kept upon cards for convenience in handling, or else in loose-leaf books whose totals appear in a general ledger "Stores" account. If, then, a certain amount of money should be paid out for the purchase of stores, the cash book entry expressing such transaction.

Both the stores item and the cash item find their way to the general ledger in totals. The stores item also appears in the stores ledger in detail, being taken from the original purchase invoices. When the stores purchased, after having been received and placed in the storeroom, are requisitioned and delivered to the producing departments, there must be a credit to the Stores account for the value of the quantity delivered, etc.

=== Progress of factory work as appears in the books ===
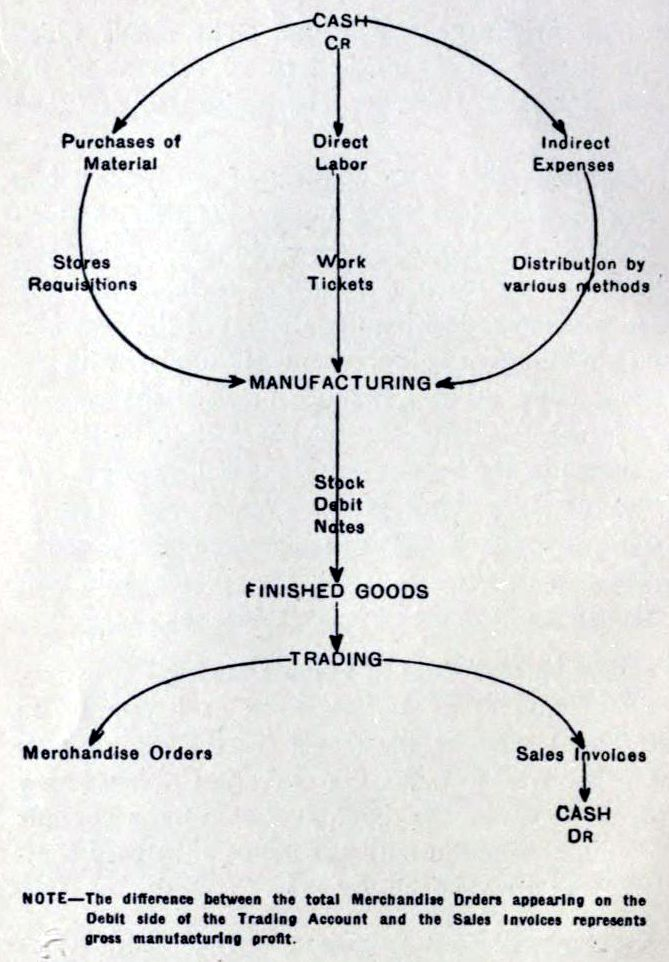
Operations of factory System, 1919

A special feature of the Principles of Factory Cost Keeping (1913) was an illustration and description of the progress of factory work as it appears in the books. It is illustrated in the accompanying diagram, which shows the operation of a factory cost system from the time payment of cash is made to begin production until the goods have been completed and are available for sale. At the bottom of the diagram Moxey noted, that the difference between the total Merchandise Orders appearing and the Debit side of the Trading Account and the Sales Invoices represents gross manufacturing profit.

Moxey further explained that the manufacturer, who has his factory cost system arranged on this general plan is in a position enabling him to adjust his selling prices so as to bring to him the largest amount of profit. He possesses a cost system organized along the same lines as his system of factory management; a system economical of operation, accurate in its results as to current operations, and one from which estimates or bids on future work can be accurately and quickly made. By a subdivision of his sales account into the different classes or grades of goods manufactured, and by carrying corresponding cost accounts, he can accurately determine the cost of producing each line of goods and the profit or loss on each grade sold.

And furthermore Moxey explained, that "the factors which enter into the manufacturing cost of any product can be grouped under the main headings of "Stores", "Direct Labor", and "Indirect Expenses." We are now in a position to take up each of these in the order given, and to show the method of determining the amount and value of each. At the same time, we shall see how to detect and prevent waste and leaks, which are important items to the manufacturer from the standpoint of profits. etc."

=== Accounting for Labour, Methods of Recording Time ===
The third chapter of the Principles of Factory Cost Keeping, is dedicated to "Accounting for Labour." The chief problem in the accounting for labor, according to Moxey, is the formulation of a system which will give an accurate record of the labor time consumed in production. Hereto different methods of recording time have been developed. Initially there were two systems.

- The methods of recording time that had started in many factories relied on a watchman or gatekeeper, stationed at the entrance to the factory, kept a record of the employees as they arrived in the morning and departed at night, each workman being known to him personally. Under this system, if an employee were late, even if only as much as a minute, he was docked a half hour's time. Any labor cost less than half an hour did not figure in production costs. The gatekeeper's record was amply sufficient for payroll purposes, as well as for the determination of costs of production in the aggregate.
- Under another system of timekeeping each laborer was assigned a number. A series of brass checks, numbered to correspond to the workmen's numbers, were hung on a board at the gatekeeper's lodge or outside the watchman's office, and as the men entered in the morning each one would take his own check off its hook and drop it into a box kept for that purpose at the watchman's office. The board on which the checks were hung, being arranged on a pivot, was turned around when the beginning whistle blew so that the side containing the checks faced into the office. Any man who was late must then pass through the watchman's office before he would receive credit for having been at the plant. This scheme worked well as long as the watchman was careful not to let any man drop the check of a comrade at the time that he dropped his own.

The weakness of both these systems lay in the fact that there was no check whatever on the time the men actually spent at work. A man might register for an absent comrade, or he might record his own arrival and then take his departure from the plant by climbing over the back fence, returning by the same route at noon in order to pass out through the gate. By this means he would receive credit for having worked a full half day, when as a matter of fact he had rendered no service whatever to his employer.

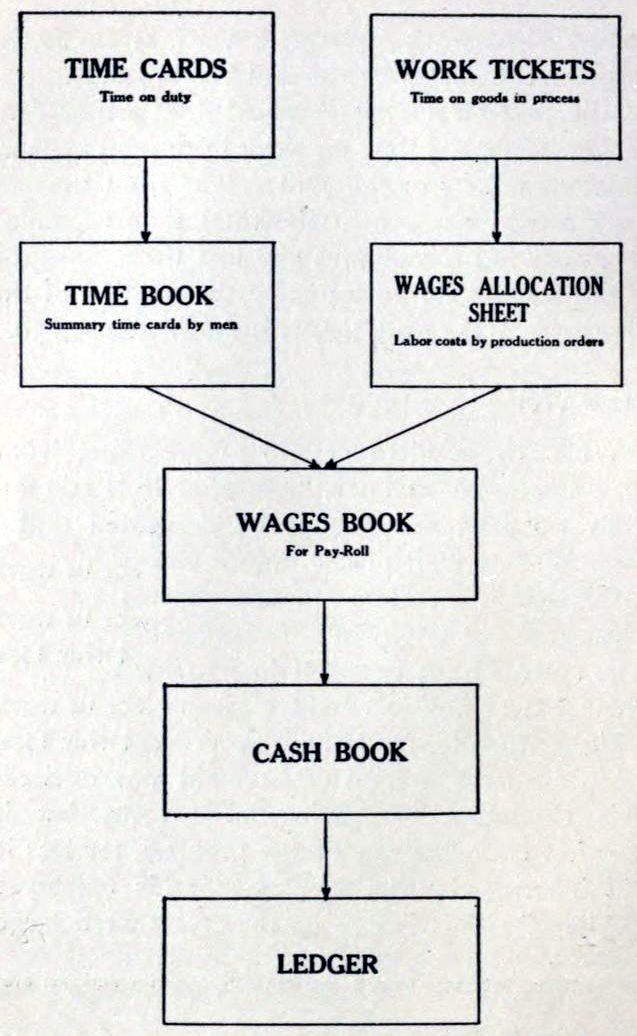
Relation between Time Cards, and Work Tickets, 1919

In order to prevent such practices it was found necessary to employ departmental timekeepers, whose duty it was to make a tour of the plant to ascertain whether each man was at his appointed task. It was soon recognized that a knowledge of the exact time spent by each man on a piece of work handled by him was not only desirable but necessary, in order to determine accurately the labor cost of each unit of product. This was accomplished by the timekeeper getting from each workman a statement of the time spent on different pieces of work; and the results of these rough guesses were used to compile the labor cost of work in process. The employment of departmental timekeepers was an added expense to the operation of the plant.

The next development was to have the men themselves keep their record of time spent on each piece of work. The results were set forth on slips which were turned into the office, where the time as shown was posted to the accounts of the various orders to which it belonged. This, as can well be seen, was a loose system, for the reason that the workman's sense of time was frequently not well developed, and there was neither incentive nor necessity for accuracy. Since there was no definite check on the workman's movements, his record would often show that he "knocked off" at 12:30 P.M., when as a matter of fact he quit work at 12:20 P.M., and loitered around the toilet room or engaged in conversation with other workmen for the extra ten minutes which had been charged by him to the work just finished.

These difficulties have been largely overcome by the use of mechanical devices for the recording of time. One record is made of the total time on duty, which serves as the basis for the pay-roll, and a second record is kept of the time actually expended on work performed, which serves as the basis of the charges to manufacturing cost. The time on duty is obtained from a time card record, while the time on work in process appears on work tickets or job cards. The total time on duty should agree with, the total time expended on goods in process, plus any lost time. Expressed diagrammatically the relation of the time cards to the work tickets is shown in the diagram. The data from the time cards were transferred into the time book, and this data would eventually end up in the general ledger.

== Reception ==
The US Federal Board for Vocational Education (1919) had described Moxey's "Principles of Factory Cost Keeping" (1919) as a "clear, simple treatment of the fundamental principles of cost accounting." In those days the field of cost accounting was largely controlled by scientific management consultants and managers, but Moxey was able to establish a firm national reputation as leader in the area. Understandably, in 1924 William Duncan Gordon and Jeremiah Lockwood dedicated their Modern Accounting Systems to Edward P. Moxey Jr.

In his 1972 article, Adolph Matz summarized that Moxey's elementary work on cost accounting was taught at the university, and in Evening School, and was part of the State's C.P.A. examination. His work was taught over four decades, but after World War II the "new trends in teaching accounting and the move away from the practical approach led in the early 1950s to the discontinuation of the course."

Moxey is nowadays also credited for advocating the practice of including imputed interest on the total capital invested (which didn't work out), and for advocating variance accounts. According to Segelod & Carlsson (2010), Moxey "offered a means to connect cost accounting and financial accounting even in times of price changes. Variance analysis became common in the United States in the early 1920s following the rapid development of standard costing between 1910 and 1920..., while the technique of connecting cost and financial accounting was... well elaborated in Anglo-Saxon countries around 1920."

Even more, according to Segelod & Carlsson (2011), the "scientific management and the introduction of variance accounts, developed by Moxey (1913), paved the way for the rapid development of standard costing in the US between 1910 and 1920."

== Selected publications ==
- Moxey, Edward Preston. Accounting Systems: A Description of Systems Appropriate to Different Kinds of Business. New York City, Alexander Hamilton Institute, 1911.
- Grundman, Otto A., Howard McNayr Jefferson, Harold Dudley Greeley & Edward Preston Moxey. Practical accounting methods: a description of systems appropriate to various kinds of business. New York, Key publishing company, 1913.
- Moxey, Edward Preston. Principles of factory cost keeping. Ronald Press Company, 1913; 1920.

Articles, a selection

- Moxey, Edward Preston. "Bank Defalcations-Their Causes and Cures." Annals of the American Academy of Political and Social Science 25 (1905): 32–42.
- Moxey Jr., Edward P. "Ethics of Accountancy", in: Annals of the American Academy of Political and Social Science. Vol. 101, The Ethics of the Professions and of Business (May, 1922), pp. 196–202
