= TNE =

TNE may stand for:

- Theta Nu Epsilon, a secret society founded at Wesleyan University in 1870
- New Tanegashima Airport (IATA airport code)
- The New European
