= Tanegashima Airport (1962) =

Former airport of Tanegashima, Okinawa, Japan (1962–2006)

- IATA: TNE; ICAO: RJFG

Summary
- Airport type: Defunct
- Location: Tanegashima, Kagoshima Prefecture, Japan
- Opened: 27 July 1962
- Closed: 15 March 2006
- Coordinates: 30°32′38″N 130°57′17″E

Map
- Location in Japan

Tanegashima Airport (種子島空港, Tanegashima Kūkō) (IATA: TNE, ICAO: RJFG) was located in Nakatane, on Tanegashima, one of the Ōsumi Islands in southern Kagoshima Prefecture, Japan.

== History ==
The airport opened on July 27, 1962. On May 19, 1973, the runway was extended from 1,100 meters to 1,500 meters. On March 16, 2006, a new Tanegashima Airport opened 8 km to the north, and this airport was closed.

The current runway site is being used for the production of tetrapods.

== Gallery ==
Aerial photograph (1967)

Aerial photograph (1977)

Aerial photograph (2012)
