= Harrison McJohnston =

American business theorist

Biographical details
- Born: July 26, 1884; McCutchanville, Indiana, U.S.
- Died: June 11, 1952 (aged 67); Yonkers, New York, U.S.

Coaching career (HC unless noted)
- 1908: Carroll (WI)

Head coaching record
- Overall: 1–5

Harrison McJohnston (July 26, 1884 – June 11, 1952) was an American organizational theorist and professor of business communication and advertising.

== Life and work ==
McJohnston had started his career as copywriter, sales correspondent, editor at two magazines, and had taught economics at Ohio State University. In 1913 he started his further academic career at the University of Illinois.

The Alexander Hamilton Institute, a well-known correspondence course provider of its day, considered his works as a part of their main instruction for both accounting and advertising.

== College football ==
Prior to his more noted work in academics and business, McJohnston was a business instructor and the seventh head football coach at the Carroll College—now known as Carroll University—in Waukesha, Wisconsin, serving for one season, in 1908, and compiling a record of 1–5.

== Selected publications ==
McJohnston authored several books, papers, and articles. Books, a selection:

- Harrison McJohnston. Business Correspondence. New York, Alexander Hamilton institute, 1918.
- Harrison McJohnston. The Brevity Book on Economics, Chicago, Brevity Publishers, 1919.
- Harrison McJohnston, Impression Analysis Improves Sales Letters, October 5, 1922
