= Alexander Hamilton Institute =

School in New York City (1909–1980s)

Coordinates: 41°7′11.8″N 74°15′0″W

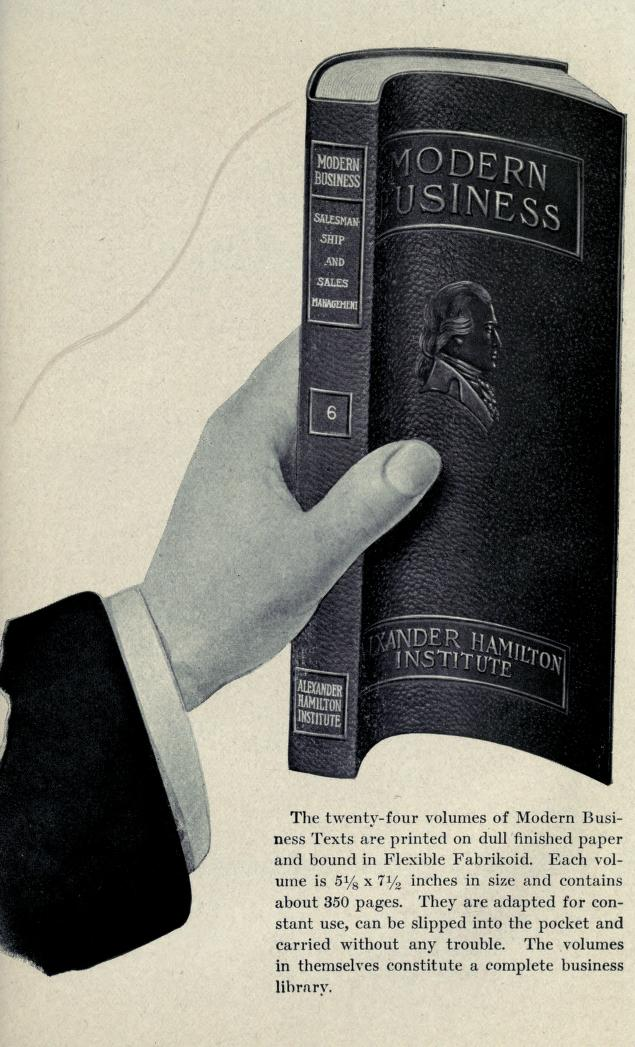
Alexander Hamilton Institute

The Alexander Hamilton Institute is a former institute for business education in New York City founded in 1909, and dissolved in the 1980s. The Alexander Hamilton Institute was a corporation engaged in collecting, organizing and transmitting business information.

== History ==
=== Initiative ===
As Dean of New York University School of Commerce, Accounts and Finance, Joseph French Johnson had for many years continually received letters requesting advice on what to read on business. These demands came not only from young men, but from mature and able executives, and sometimes even from the most successful business leaders. To all such requests Dean Johnson was obliged to reply that the only practical way to study the fundamental principles of business in a systematic manner was to attend the lectures in university schools of commerce.

At that time the literature of business was scanty and for the most part of doubtful value. Working alone, a man could get but little help in his efforts to widen and deepen his knowledge of business principles. It became evident that there was a great need for an organized, logical statement of the basic principles on which successful business is founded. It was determined to establish an institution which should meet the demand. After years of preparation the Alexander Hamilton Institute was established in 1909.

=== Its name ===
In selecting the name, it was agreed that none could be so suitable as that of Alexander Hamilton (1757–1804). According to the institute's own account, Hamilton was remembered for his statesmanship, as well as his roles as soldier, financier, author, organizer, and economist.

The institute described Hamilton as a highly effective manager in the early years of the United States Government. When he became the first Secretary of the Treasury in 1789, he found a chaotic government, without money, without credit, and without organization. He secured order, provided funds and created prosperity. He investigated the industries and directed the early commercial development of the United States. The Alexander Hamilton Institute (1921) summarized: "He touched the dead corpse of the public credit, and it sprang upon its feet. He smote the rock of the nation's resources and abundant streams of revenue gushed forth."

According to the institute, Hamilton was an effective executive and systematizer; he himself worked out an accounting system for the United States Government which, with but slight modifications, remained in force for more than a hundred years.

=== The plan ===
The Modern Business Course and Service is a systematic, time-saving method of bringing to any man's office or home that business knowledge and training which he needs, but which he cannot acquire through his own experience.

It is designed for the benefit of two groups of men:

1. those who already are in executive or semi-executive positions;
2. young men who have brains and the ambition to become business executives.

The publication which is intended for men who want to improve themselves and succeed in their careers. These men may or may not have had a thorough education; that is not important; neither is a persons level of education, wealth, or social status. Instead they must have the ability and enough commitment to spend a portion of their spare time reading and thinking about business problems and solutions.

== "Survey of Modern Business Science" ==
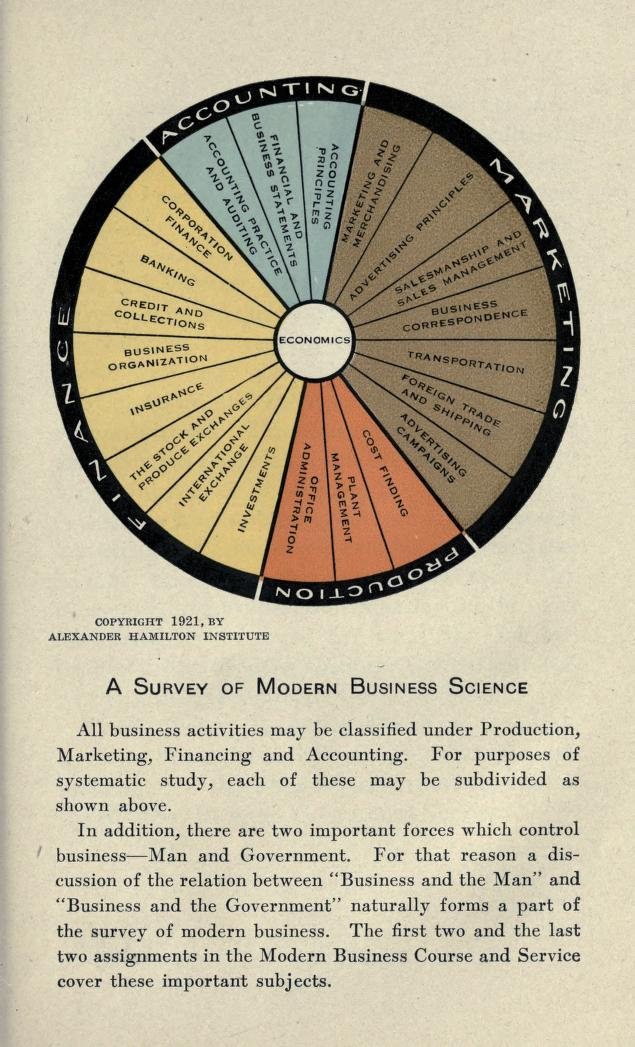
A Survey of Modern Business Science, 1921

In their 1921 "Forging Ahead in Business" the Alexander Hamilton Institute claimed there are four fundamental activities in every business: Production, Marketing, Financing, and Accounting. The accompanying illustration shows the whole field of business charted in such a way as to show clearly the relation of various business activities to each other. Economics, the study of business conditions and business policies, is the hub of all business activity. Radiating from it are the four grand divisions of business : Production, Marketing, Financing, Accounting. These in turn are subdivided into the more detailed activities which they include.

All business activities may be classified under Production, Marketing, Financing and Accounting. For purposes of systematic study, each of these may be subdivided as shown above. In addition, there are two important forces which control business : Man and Government. For that reason a discussion of the relation between "Business and the Man" and "Business and the Government" naturally forms a part of the survey of modern business. The first two and the last two assignments in the Modern Business Course and Service cover these important subjects.

The arrangement of the subjects has been carefully planned so that the maximum benefit will be derived by following the assignments in their regular order. In the chart you see the logical arrangement of these subjects as related to the business world. Note that the order in which these subjects are treated in the Course is not according to their arrangement in the chart. On the contrary, the more general subjects are first considered; then come the more complex—the specializations and enlargements upon the foundation subjects. This plan permits a progressive arrangement that makes for a broad understanding of the science of business.

Just as any university or college requires a knowledge of certain subjects before others can be taken up, because this more general knowledge is essential to a proper understanding of the more advanced, so we have arranged the subjects treated in the Modern Business Course and Service in a similar manner.

Texts, Talks, Lectures, Problems, Monthly Letters, Financial and Trade Reviews, Reports and Service—these are the important features of the Modern Business Course and Service.

== Notable people ==
=== Alumni ===
- Ellsworth Hunt Augustus – businessman
- Sewell Avery – president of the United States Gypsum Company
- Bruce Fairchild Barton – author, advertising executive, and politician
- Ernst Behrend – founder and president of the Hammermill Paper Company
- Ken Boles – politician in the state of Florida
- Walter Chrysler – pioneer in the automotive industry and founder and namesake of Chrysler Corporation
- Armand Cloutier – Canadian Liberal party member
- Francis A. Countway – president of Lever Bros. Co.
- Anthony Fokker – aviation pioneer, aircraft designer, and aircraft manufacturer
- Homer Heck – businessman and politician
- Charles Elmer Hires – pharmacist and founder of the Charles E. Hires Co., which manufactured and distributed Hires Root Beer
- Roy W. Howard – president of E. W. Scripps Company, president of United Press, and chairman of Scripps Howard Newspapers
- George Matthew Verity – founder and first president of American Rolling Mill Company
- William Wrigley Jr. – chewing gum industrialist and founder of the Wm. Wrigley Jr. Company

=== Presidents ===
- Jeremiah Jenks – second president, economist, professor at Cornell University and New York University
- Joseph French Johnson – founding dean (president) and professor and dean of the School of Commerce, Accounts and Finance at New York University
- William H. Lough – co-founder and first vice-president
- John Thomas Madden – third president (started in 1929) and dean and professor at the School of Commerce, Accounts and Finance at New York University

=== Advisory council and board ===
- T. Coleman du Pont – advisory council, president of E. I. du Pont de Nemours and Company, and United States Senator
- John Hays Hammond – advisory council, mining engineer with the British South Africa Company and Cecil Rhodes
- Dexter S. Kimball – chairman (1929) and professor of industrial engineering at Cornell University
- Frank A. Vanderlip – advisory council, president of the National City Bank of New York (now Citibank), and Assistant Secretary of the Treasury

=== Staff ===
- Bruce Fairchild Barton – general publicity
- Dexter S. Kimball – cost finding

=== Special lecturers ===
- Harrington Emerson – efficiency engineer and special lecturer
- A. Barton Hepburn – president of Chase National Bank and Comptroller of the Currency
- Charles Miller – Major General of the Pennsylvania Army National Guard and was a founder of the Galena-Signal Oil Company

=== Authors of course books ===
- Ralph C. Davis – professor of business organization at New York University
- Jacob Anton De Haas – professor of business management and accountancy at the Nederlandsche Handels-Hoogeschool and Harvard University
- Lee Galloway – professor of commerce and industry at New York University
- Jeremiah Jenks – economist and professor at Cornell University and New York University
- Joseph French Johnson – professor and dean of the School of Commerce, Accounts and Finance at New York University
- Edward D. Jones – investment banker who founded the company today known as Edward Jones Investments
- Dexter S. Kimball –professor of industrial engineering at Cornell University
- Harrison McJohnston – professor of business communication and advertising
- Edward P. Moxey – professor of accounting at the Wharton School of Finance and Commerce

== Popular culture ==
The Alexander Hamilton Institute was referenced disparagingly along with H. L. Mencken in The Sun Also Rises by Ernest Hemingway (1926).
