= Simon Pierre Robineau =

American politician

Florida House of Representative
- In office 1929–1936

Miami City Attorney
- In office 1919–1921

Personal details
- Born: April 8, 1882 Versailles, France
- Died: December 6, 1952 (aged 70) Miami, Florida, US
- Resting place: Woodlawn Park, Miami
- Party: Democratic
- Spouse: Frances Oliver Robineau
- Children: Jeanne Jacqueline Luddington, Frances Patricia VanDevere McCulloch
- Occupation: Attorney

Military service
- Allegiance: United States
- Branch/service: United States Army, Army Air Corps
- Years of service: 1917–1919, 1944–1945
- Rank: Colonel
- Battles/wars: World War I, World War II

Simon Pierre Robineau (April 8, 1882 – December 6, 1952) was an attorney, soldier and member of the Florida House of Representatives.

== Early life ==
Born in Versailles, France, Robineau’s parents brought him to live in America as a boy. Robineau's father, Jean S. Robineau, was a surgeon and had visited military hospitals during the American Civil War.

He became a U.S. citizen when he turned 21.

Marjory Stoneman Douglas described him in her book, Voice of the River: “He was slender when I met him. He had a long, French nose, dark eyes, a little moustache, and a humorous mouth. He was witty, charming and well-read.”

== Education ==
Robineau attended middle and high school near Chicago. He earned his Bachelor of Arts degree from Lake Forest College, 1907. He earned a Master of Arts degree from the University of the South, 1908. Robineau conducted post graduate studies at the Sorbonne and University of Freiburg in 1908, 1909. He went on to earn an LLB from Harvard University in 1912.

== Civilian career ==
By 1914, Robineau was practicing law in Boston. In 1918, Robineau was a partner in the Rose & Robineau law firm in Miami. Upon returning from military service, Robineau earned appointment as Miami City Attorney.

Robineau was an early board member in the Zonite Products Corporation.

S.P won election to the Florida House of Representatives, representing Miami from 1929 through 1936.

Robineau introduced the bill in the Florida Legislature which made Stephen Foster's song, Old Folks at Home, also known as Suwanne River, the State Song in 1935. He later helped write the state pari-mutuel laws.

In 1936, he served as a witness in the Senate impeachment of Judge Halstead Ritter.

He had a number of real estate investments and helped develop the city of El Portal, FL.

== Military career ==
During World War I but before America joined the war, Robineau fought for France. At the outset of his service in an American uniform, Robineau was an interpreter for the medical corps. His medical training and his fluency in French helped communications between American surgeons and French medical staff at field hospitals.

Soon enough, his skills caught the attention of the military intelligence section and he was given leadership of a team of interpreters.

When World War II began, Robineau was nearly 60. He was promoted into the Army Air Corps, reaching the rank of colonel. He resumed intelligence duties, focusing on occupied France, where he served for over 30 months. In 1945 he was part of a committee that helped establish the rules and regulations for American occupied military control over Germany for the immediate post-war period.

=== Military awards ===
He was awarded the Purple Heart, the Order of Etoile Noir, the Bronze Star and the Legion of Merit.

== Fraternal and civic affiliations ==
Robineau was a regent of the University of Miami, a member of The Florida Bar and Dade County bar associations, the Military Order of the World Wars, Alpha Tau Omega, Theta Nu Epsilon and Omega Psi. He was a Mason, and an Elk. He was Commander of the Harvey W Seeds Post #29 of the American Legion.

He died in Miami in December 1952.

== See also ==
- List of members of the American Legion

== Sources ==
- Morales, Ralph (2018). Harvey W Seeds American Legion Post #29 History. Miami: Harvey Seeds Press. ISBN 978-0692128497.
- Staff. "WWI Draft Cards". Florida Memory.
- US Adjutant General Military Records
