= Dexter S. Kimball =

American engineer and academic (1865–1952)

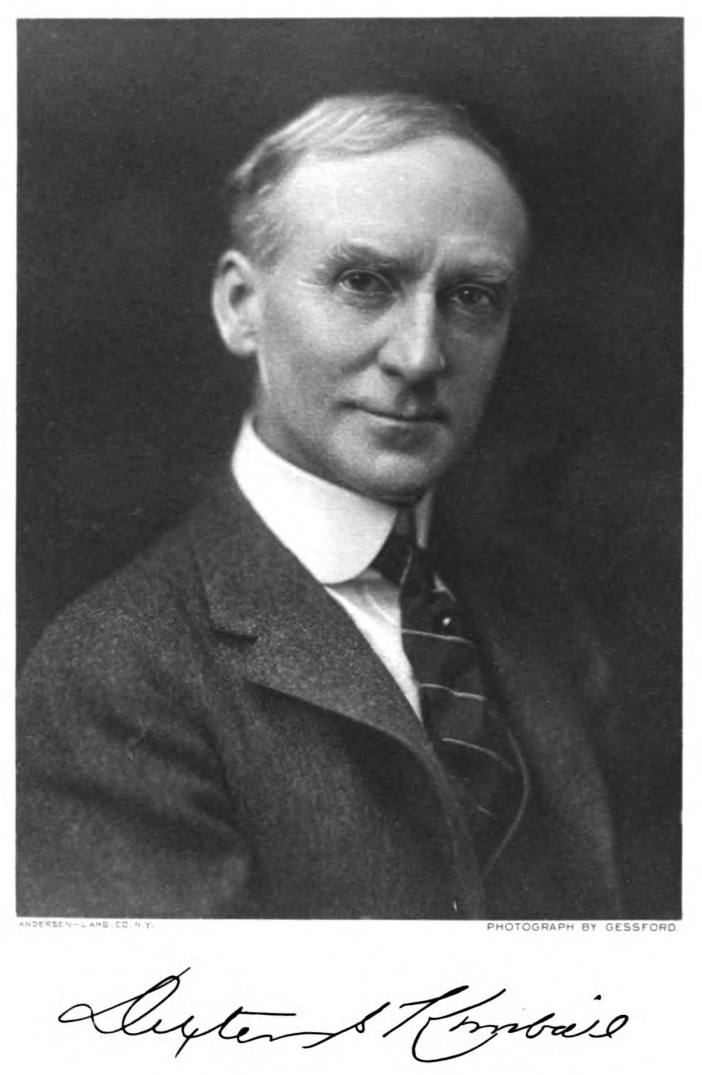
Dexter Simpson Kimball (1865-1952)

Dexter Simpson Kimball (October 21, 1865 – November 1, 1952) was an American engineer, professor of industrial engineering at Cornell University, early management author and president of the American Society of Mechanical Engineers in 1922–23.

== Biography ==
Born in New River, New Brunswick, Kimball grew up in California, and obtained his AB in mechanical engineering from Stanford University in 1896.

Kimball had started his career as engineering apprentice in 1881. From 1887 to 1893 he worked at Union Iron Works in San Francisco, California, and from 1896 to 1898. From 1898 to 1901 he was lecturer in machine design at Cornell University. After another working period in industry, he was appointed professor of machine construction at Cornell University. And from 1915 to his retirement in 1936 he was professor of industrial engineering and dean of its College of Engineering.

Kimball was elected president of the American Society of Mechanical Engineers for the year 1922–23. He was awarded the Worcester Reed Warner Medal in 1933.

== Selected publications ==
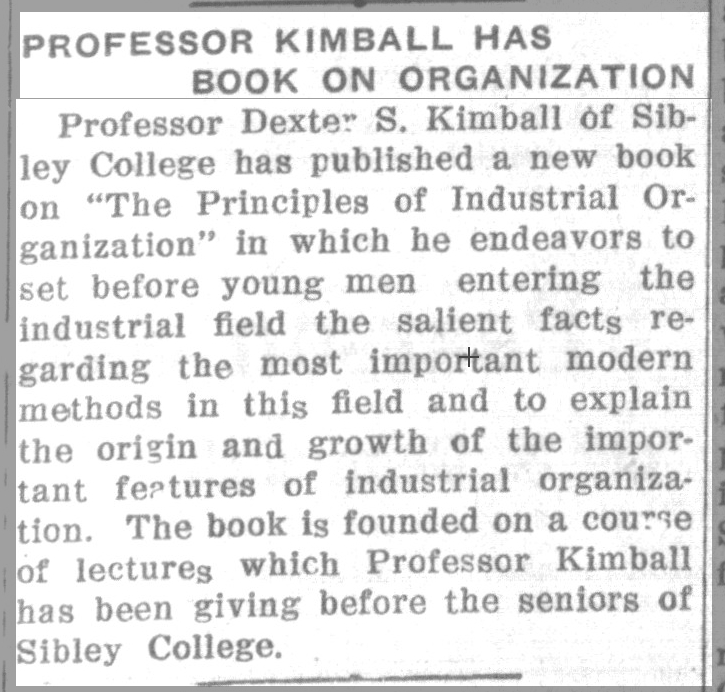
Article in The Cornell Daily Sun, 16 Feb. 1914.

- Kimball, Dexter S. Elements of machine design. New York, J. Wiley & sons, 1909.
- Kimball, Dexter S. Principles of industrial organization. New York : McGraw-Hill, 1913; 1919.
- Kimball, Dexter S. Auditing and cost-finding. Part I: Auditing, Part II: Cost-finding. New York, Alexander Hamilton institute, 1914.
- Kimball, Dexter S. Cost finding. New York : Alexander Hamilton Institute, 1919, 1921.
- Kimball, Dexter S. Plant management. New York : Alexander Hamilton Institute, 1919; 1922.
- Kimball, Dexter S. ‘Has Taylorism Survived?’ Mechanical Engineering, 48: 593-594 (June, 1927)
- Kimball, Dexter S. I remember. New York, McGraw-Hill, 1953.
