= Theta Nu Epsilon =

American social college fraternity

- ΘΝΕ
- Founded: December 11, 1870; 155 years ago Wesleyan University
- Type: Social
- Former affiliation: Independent; NIC
- Status: Defunct
- Emphasis: Sophomores
- Scope: National
- Motto: "Little is known, what is known is kept secret"
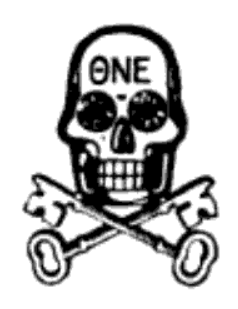
- Member badge
- Colors: Green and Black
- Publication: The Keys; Theta Nu Epsilon Quarterly
- Chapters: 104
- Headquarters: United States

Theta Nu Epsilon (ΘΝΕ, commonly known as T.N.E.) was an American sophomore class collegiate society that later became a traditional social fraternity. Founded at Wesleyan University in 1870 as a chapter of Skull and Bones, the society expanded into a new national organization. It accepted members regardless of their fraternity status. It was a member of the National Interfraternity Conference (NIC).

Through various controversies, most chapters of the society went inactive by 1920. It reformed as a social fraternity in 1925 and regained its membership in the NIC. It did not survive World War II, and the society's last official chapter closed in 1942. However, several chapters continued to operated sub rosa.

== History ==
=== Early history ===
Theta Nu Epsilon was founded on December 11, 1870, in Room Seven of Wesleyan’s South College by members of Alpha Delta Phi, Delta Kappa Epsilon, Eclectic and Psi Upsilon.

Herbert Hull Coston, Coleridge Allen Hart, George Washington Shonk, and Lyman Horace Weeks were members from Alpha Delta Phi. Benjamin Emmons Gerst, Arthur Collins McClay, and George Bickford Davey Toy were from Delta Kappa Epsilon and Stephen Judson Kirby, George Henry Towle, Alfred Charles True were from Eclectic. Rounding out the group were Psi Upsilon members George William Elliott, Charles Hamlin Furber, William Henry Lawrence, and Olin Levings Livesey as well as Amos Howard Hoagland who was not a member of any fraternity.

Founded as the Wesleyan chapter of Skull & Bones, two years later the chapter cut its ties to Yale and changed the bones of the Skull & Bones emblem to keys.

TNE was a sophomore class society, and in a traditional type of chapter, members were chosen near the end of their freshman or the start of their sophomore year. Once selected, the new members were active and responsible for the operation of the chapter during their sophomore year. As juniors and seniors, they were considered honorary members and only had authority in an advisory role. The society always excluded freshmen. From the beginning, the identities of the sophomore members were kept secret. In yearbooks, the names of the sophomores appeared in code. The Alpha chapter and legitimate chapters continued this traditional type.

=== National organization ===
Theta Nu Epsilon had immediate success at Wesleyan, and it grew rapidly and spread throughout colleges across the United States. The Alpha chapter at Wesleyan acted as the national organization and continued to grant charters until 1907. The society's first convention was at the Delevan House hotel in Albany in 1885, and conventions were held annually thereafter. A movement for a formal national organization resulted in a convention held at the Hotel Astor in New York on March 29 and 30, 1907. The convention established a national governing body which then incorporated the society under the laws of the State of New York. The new national organization was given the authority to manage the national operations of TNE and grant new chapters.

=== Internal struggles ===
In 1913, the National Interfraternity Conference (predecessor to the current North American Interfraternity Conference) officially announced its opposition to T.N.E. and recommended to the fraternities represented in the conference that they forbid their members to join Theta Nu Epsilon The relations between Theta Nu Epsilon and the N.I.C. improved and the N.I.C. retracted its opposition at its session in New York in 1925. Theta Nu Epsilon was later accepted as a member of the N.I.C. in the 1930s.

=== Post WWII ===
The last legitimate chapter ceased operations in 1942. Although the national organization stopped operating in World War II, some of the chapters of that national continued into the late 1940s. Henry Kelly ultimately merged his efforts with the Alpha chapter. Some, but not all, of these independent chapters began initiating women as members in the 1970s. The last active chapters were Alpha chapter at Wesleyan, the University of Missouri, the University of New Mexico, and the University of Virginia.

Several of the older chapters that separated in the early 1900s survived as independent entities on their respective campuses. These include Skull & Keys at the University of California, Berkeley, The Phoenix – S K Club at Harvard University, the Tejas Club at the University of Texas at Austin, The Machine at the University of Alabama, Skull Society at the University of Maine, and a group using the TNE name at the University of Nebraska–Lincoln.

== Symbols ==
Theta Nu Epsilon's motto is "Little is known, what is known is kept secret". Its insignia is a skull and crossed keys; one eye of the skull is red for Bacchus the god of wine and the other eye is green for jealousy. The insignia is based on that of Skull and Bones, with the former's crossed bones being replaced by keys. Its colors are red and black. Its badge is a gold version of the insignia—a skull and crossed keys, with gems for eyes, and the Greek letters ΘΝΕ.

Its publications were The Keys and Theta Nu Epsilon Quarterly.

== Chapters ==
Because of early splits in the national organization, several unofficial national coalitions and rogue groups granted their own charters. As a result, many conflicts exist surrounding the actual founding dates and chapter designations, even at the institutions that had officially recognized groups.

== Notable members ==
- Fleming Newman Alderson, West Virginia House of Delegates
- George F. Alexander, judge of the United States territorial court for the Alaska Territory
- Roy William Baker, U.S. Consul in Bristol and U.S. Vice Consul in Edinburgh, Barcelona, Malaga, and London
- Guy G. Butler, Iowa House of Representatives
- Harris T. Collier, head football coach for Tulane and Georgia Tech
- Chester Adgate Congdon, Minnesota House of Representatives
- John C. B. Ehringhaus, Governor of North Carolina and North Carolina House of Representatives
- Edward Francis Feely, U.S. Minister to Bolivia and member of the Council on Foreign Relations
- William Hayward (American attorney)
- John Thomas Madden, dean of NYU School of Business and President of Alexander Hamilton Institute
- James Rogers McConnell, member of the Lafayette Escadrille
- Prex Merrill, football player and coach
- Simon Pierre Robineau, Florida House of Representatives.
- Ira L. Smith, West Virginia Senate

== In popular culture ==
- The T.N.E. emblem was featured on the album cover of E-40's gold-selling 2006 album My Ghetto Report Card.

== See also ==
- Collegiate secret societies in North America
- List of social fraternities
