= Joseph French Johnson =

American economist (1853–1925)

Joseph F. Johnson
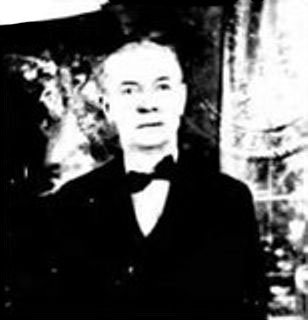
- Born: August 24, 1853; Hardwick, Massachusetts, US
- Died: January 22, 1925 (aged 71); Newfoundland, New Jersey, US

Academic background
- Education: Harvard University
- Academic advisor: Johannes Conrad

Academic work
- Institutions: New York University

Joseph French Johnson (August 24, 1853 – January 22, 1925) was an American economist, journalist, Professor, and Dean of the School of Commerce, Accounts and Finance, New York University, and founding Dean of the Alexander Hamilton Institute in New York in 1909.

== Biography ==
Johnson was born in Hardwick, Massachusetts, in 1853, son of Gardner Nye and Eliza (French) Johnson, a paternal ancestor, John Johnson, having emigrated from England and settled in Massachusetts about 1635. He was prepared for College in Jennings Seminary at Aurora, Illinois, from which he entered Northwestern University at Evanston. Passing later to Harvard he graduated as a Bachelor of Arts in 1878, subsequently studying for a short time under Johannes Conrad at the University of Halle-Wittenberg in Germany.

From 1878 to 1881 he was a teacher at the Harvard School in Chicago. Soon after, he entered journalism as part of the editorial staff of the Springfield, Massachusetts, Republican. He did this for several years, and afterward served as Financial Editor of the Chicago Tribune. After twelve years of a practical journalist's life he was called to the School of Finance and Economy in the University of Pennsylvania. In 1893–1894 he was associate professor of Business Practice and since 1894 he has been Professor of Journalism, that department of instruction having just been established in that year. Although it is a wholly new branch of university work, considerable success has already been attained by Professor Johnson in training College men for practical careers in newspaper offices.

Sequentially he lectured at Columbia University, and in 1901 became a professor at New York University and in 1903 Dean of the School of Commerce, Accounts and Finance of the university. While there, he was one of the founders of Delta Mu Delta business administration honor society. In 1909 he was founding Dean of the Alexander Hamilton Institute in New York. Johnson then became a member of the commission to revise the banking laws of the State of New York, and worked for the National Monetary Commission.

Johnson was editor at the Modern Business Series published by the Alexander Hamilton Institute, and of the Journal of Accountancy.

He died in Newfoundland, New Jersey on January 22, 1925.

== Selected publications ==
- Johnson, Joseph French. Money and Banking: A Discussion of the Principles of Money and Credit, (1904)
- Johnson, Joseph French. Money and currency. 1906.
- Johnson, Joseph French. The Canadian banking system. US Government Printing Office, 1910.
- Johnson, Joseph French. Organized business knowledge (1914)
- Johnson, Joseph French. Banking. 1914.
- Johnson, Joseph French. Business and the man Vol. 1, 1918.
- Johnson, Joseph French. Money and Currency in Relation to Industry, Prices, and the Rate of Interest. Ginn, 1921.

Articles, a selection:

- Johnson, Joseph French. "Proposed reforms of the monetary system", in: Cannals of the American Academy of Political and Social Science. Vol. 11, No. 2b (1898).
- Johnson, Joseph French. "The Crisis and Panic of 1907." Political Science Quarterly 23.3 (1908): 454–467.
- White, Horace, and Joseph French Johnson. "Central Bank: Discussion." American Economic Association Quarterly (1909): 370–376.
- Houston, D. F., Kemmerer, E. W., Johnson, J. F., Wildman, M. S., Carver, T. N., Taussig, F. W., ... & Fisher, I. (1911). "Money and prices: Discussion." The American Economic Review, 1(2), 46–70.
