= Martin R. Gainsbrugh =

American economist

Martin Reuben Gainsbrugh (January 29, 1907 – April 1977) was an American economist, practicing statistician, writer, and educator, He was vice-president and chief economist of The Conference Board, adjunct professor at the New York University, and president of the American Statistical Association in 1961.

== Biography ==
Gainsbrugh received his M.A. in economics at the University of Rochester in 1928, and his Ph.D. from Columbia University in 1932.

Gainsbrugh started his career as economic analyst for Trade-Ways, industrial consultants in 1933. In 1937 he moved to The National Industrial Conference Board, where he spent the greater part of his career. He became Chief Economist and its vice-president, and retired in 1972. From 1944 to 1972 he was also adjunct professor of economics at the New York University, and worked as consultant for government and industry for decades. In 1952 he was elected as a Fellow of the American Statistical Association.

Gainsbrugh is described by Birnbaum (1977) as "a generalist who worked in depth in many areas of economics and statistics including unemployment statistics, price indexes, consumer economics, wealth estimates, wages behavior, profits, inflation, national income... no one who was more thoroughly familiar with the uses and limitations of the major statistical series published by the Federal Government."

== Work ==
=== High-Level Consumption, 1935 ===
The first detailed estimates of aggregate consumer expenditures for goods and services in the United States over a period of time appeared in William H. Lough with the assistance of Martin Gainsbrugh, High-Level Consumption, McGraw-Hill, New York, 1935. These pioneer estimates covered the years 1909, 1914, 1919, 1921, 1923, 1925, 1927, 1929, and 1931. The data for the later years were revised and extended by Harold Barger, Outlay and Income in the United States, 1921–1938, National Bureau of Economic Research, New York, 1942. In the 1940s, J. Frederic Dewhurst and Associates (America's Needs and Resources, 1947) revised these various estimates and expanded those on recreational expense to take account of estimates by Julius Weinberger, "The Economic Aspects of Recreation", Harvard Business Review, summer issue, 1937.

In 1935, estimates of aggregate consumer expenditures in detail for 1909 and 1929 and selected years between were prepared by Martin Gainsbrugh and published in William H. Lough, HighLevel Consumption... This book included a comparison with The Brookings Institution's aggregates for 1929, showing that the two estimates were very close for food expense, and reasonably close for attire and home maintenance; but the estimates by Lough and Gainsbrugh of expenditures for all other items were much higher than the Brookings' figures.

== Selected publications ==
- Lough, William H., and Martin R. Gainsborough. High-Level Consumption. (1935).
- Backman, Jules, and Martin Reuben Gainsbrugh (eds.). Behavior of Wages. National Industrial Conference Board, 1948.
- Gainsbrugh, Martin Reuben, and Jules Backman. (eds.) Inflation and the Price Indexes. National Industrial Conference Board, 1966.
- National Industrial Conference Board, Jules Backman, and Martin Reuben Gainsbrugh. (eds.) The Conference Board Presents Deflation Or Inflation?. Johnson Reprint, 1969.

Articles, a selection:

- Backman, Jules, and Martin R. Gainsbrugh. "Productivity and living standards." Industrial and Labor Relations Review (1949): 163–194.
- Gainsbrugh, Martin R. "Allocation of Resources to Research and Development." Proceedings of a Conference on Research and Development and Its Impact on the Economy. NSF-58-36. Washington: National Science Foundation. 1958.
- Gainsbrugh, Martin R. "Viewing Advertising as Investment.." Advertising Age (February 2, 1959): 69–70.
