= John Thomas Madden =

American academic (1882–1948)

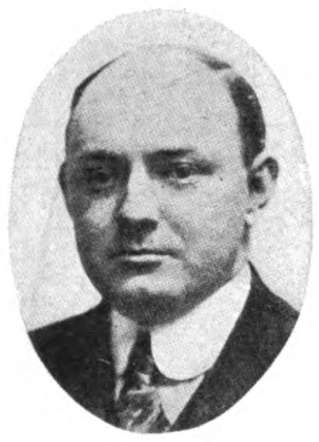
- Born: October 26, 1882; Worcester, Massachusetts, US
- Died: July 2, 1948 (aged 65); New York City, New York, US
- Occupations: Dean, president, and professor

Academic background
- Education: New York University

Academic work
- Discipline: Accounting
- Institutions: New York University; Alexander Hamilton Institute

John Thomas Madden (October 26, 1882 – July 2, 1948) was an American educator and academic administrator. He served as the dean of the New York University School of Commerce, Accounts & Finance and president of Alexander Hamilton Institute. Accounting historian Julia Grant names him as one of the "fathers of modern accounting".

== Early life ==
John Thomas Madden was born in Worcester, Massachusetts, on October 26, 1882. His parents were Mary Teresa (née Lawton) and Michael James Madden. He attended Worcester public schools, before working in business from 1900 to 1909.

In 1909, Madden enrolled in New York University (NYU), graduating with a Bachelor of Commercial Science, summa cum laude, in 1911. While at NYU, he was member of Theta Nu Epsilon and Alpha Kappa Psi (1911). He became a Certified Public Accountant in New York in 1911.

== Career ==
After college, Madden worked as a certified public accountant. Starting in 1911, he was an instructor in the accounting department New York University. He became head of the NYU Accounting Department in 1917. He became a member of the University Senate and secretary of the NYU School of Commerce, Accounts & Finance in 1918. In 1922, Madden became assistant dean of the School of Commerce, Accounts & Finance. He became acting dean in 1925 and was promoted to dean on October 24, 1925. Madden was dean through 1940 and a professor from the 1930s until 1947.

Madden authored numerous texts on accounting, currency, mortgage banking, and other business practices. He was the major figure in developing the modern, professional procurement process. Accounting historian Julia Grant names him as one of the "fathers of modern accounting".

On November 1, 1929, Madden became the third president of Alexander Hamilton Institute, a distance education business course; he remained in that position until 1935. During the 1930s, Madden partnered with Sing Sing prison's warden Lewis E. Lawes to teach inmates at the prison in Ossining, New York, getting his faculty at NYU to volunteer to provide lectures. Madden said, "This idea is a mighty fine one, especially at this time. There are many men here who would not have been here five years ago. They committed no strange offenses. They merely carried on the business practices they had been used to. But these practices, with the advent of Depression, became criminal."

Madden provided procurement training to the military during World War II. In 1943, Madden took a three-month leave of absence from teaching at NYU to work as the director of personnel for the movie theater chain Loew's, Inc., continuing as a consultant for the company until he died.

Madden was the president of the American Association of University Instructors in Accounting in 1921. He founded the Institute of International Finance in 1926 and became its director in November 1927. He was president of the International Accountants Society from 1928 until he died in 1948. He was also a public governor of the New York Curb Exchange. Madden belonged to the American Economic Association, the Merchants Association of New York City, the National Association of Cost Accountants, and the Pan American Society.

== Honors ==
Madden received an honorary M.A. from the College of Holy Cross in 1921. He was awarded the Commander of Order of the Crown of Romania and a Commander of the Order of Leopold II from Belgium. The John T. Madden Memorial Award at NYU's Stern School of Business was named in his honor.

== Personal life ==
Madden married Anna Marie Callahan of Worcester, Massachusetts, on September 3, 1912. They lived in Orange, New Jersey and had four daughters, before she died on August 3, 1933. Madden married Ann Corrigan of Newark, New Jersey on January 25, 1941. They had homes in New York City and Newark, New Jersey.

Madden was president of Theta Nu Epsilon from 1926 to 1932, and again (of the splintered TNE) from 1935 to 1946. He was president of Beta Alpha Psi, the finance, accounting, and information systems fraternity from 1930 to 1932. He was elected president of Alpha Kappa Psi in 1919 and again in 1920.

Madden died on July 2, 1948, at his home in New York City at the age of 65 years. More than 1,000 people attended a mass for Madden at St. Patrick's Cathedral on July 6. New York University's School of Commerce cancelled classes on July 6 in his honor.
