= William H. Lough =

American economist

William Henry Lough Jr. (May 11, 1881 – 1950s) was an American economist, and professor of finance and transportation at the New York University School of Commerce, known for his work in the field of corporate finance.

== Biography ==
Lough was born in Dayton, Ohio to William Henry Lough and Esther Green Stubbs. He obtained his AB from the Oshkosh State Normal School (now University of Wisconsin–Oshkosh) in 1899, and his AM from Harvard University in 1902. He married Elizabeth Howe Shepard on August 24, 1907, in De Pere, Wisconsin.

Lough started his career at the traffic department of the Baltimore and Ohio Railroad in 1902. In 1904–05 he worked on the editorial staff of The Wall Street Journal. In 1905 he joined the New York University School of Commerce, Accounts and Finance as Assistant Professor and got promoted Professor of Finance and Transportation. In 1910 he co-founded and became vice-president of the Alexander Hamilton Institute, a corporation engaged in collecting, organizing and transmitting business information. He was also president of the Business Book Bureau. Later in the 1910s he became president of the Business Training Corporation in New York City. In 1915 he investigated the financial conditions in South America for the US Department of Commerce. Around 1917 Lough was responsible for launching the College of Business at the American Expeditionary Forces University. He was also Head of Division of Business Training of Army Educational Corps, American Expeditionary Forces in France.

In the summer of 1921 he was lecturer on Business Management at the University of California. Further in the 1920s Lough continued his work at the School of Commerce of New York University, and as president of the Business Training Corporation. but by 1925 he was listed as 'formerly professor of economics, New York University.' He was President of the Charter League of New Rochelle.

In the 1930s Lough had founded Trade-Ways, industrial consultants and became its president. Trade-Ways "studied industry problems and made preliminary survey of what should go into an indoctrination and training program. Its field staff worked out several different programs and tested them out with salesmen." In 1935 he published his last book "High-Level Consumption" (1935) with assistance of the economist and statistician Martin R. Gainsborough, who was employed at Trade-Ways.

== Work ==
=== Corporation finance, 1909 ===
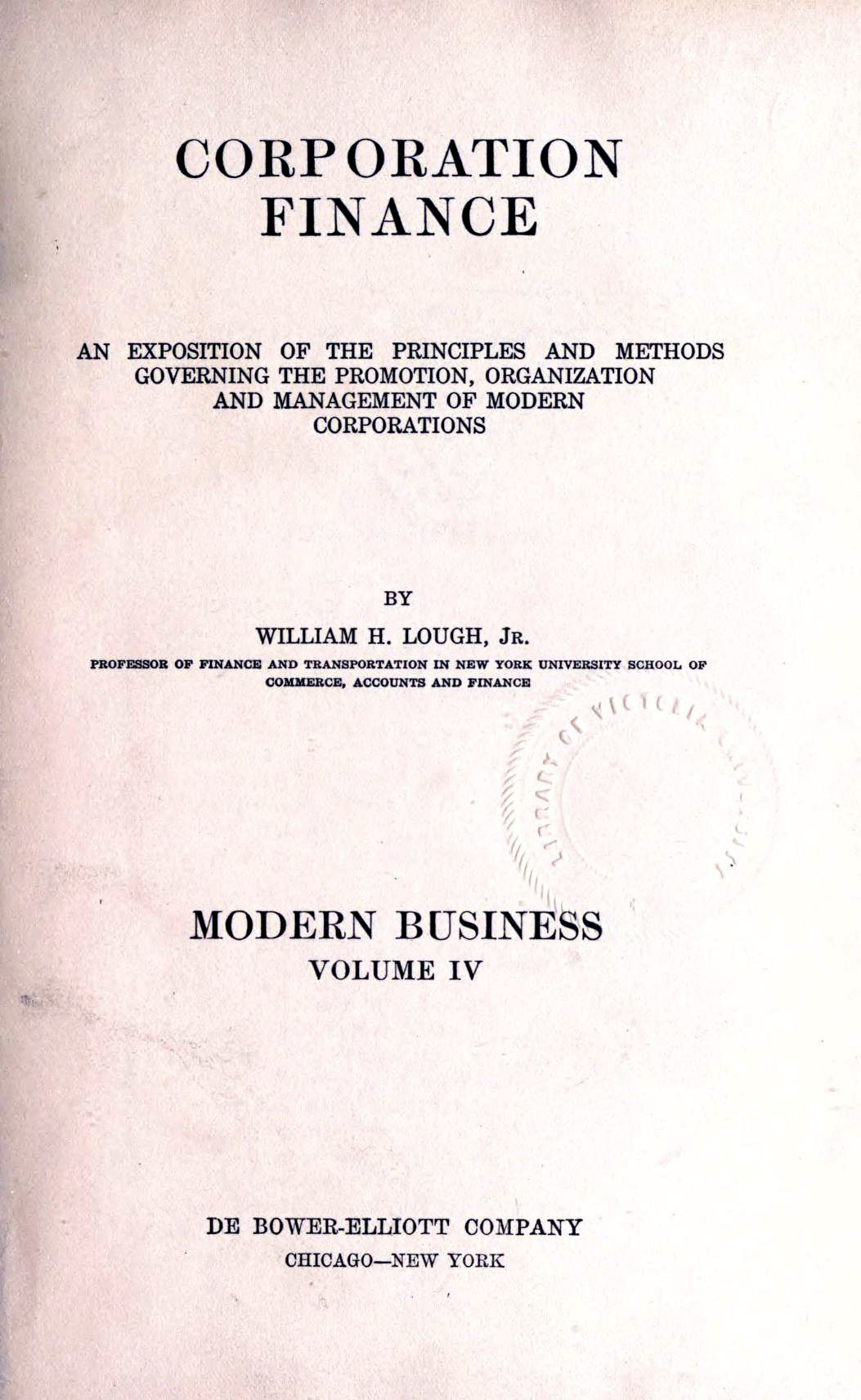
Title page, 1909

In a 1910 review Hammond stated, that Professor Lough's book is the most comprehensive, the most scholarly and the best written treatise on the subject of corporation finance which has appeared in this country. Like the other volumes in the series of which it is a part, the book was written primarily in the interest of business men, although the author expresses the hope that it will also prove useful to stock and bond brokers, to lawyers, to bankers and to accountants. It is sure to do this but it is also bound to be of great use to teachers and students in the courses in business administration in our colleges and universities. It is more than probable that it was the author's experience with just such students which accounts in large measure for the clearness and logical method of his presentation.

The book is not a philosophical treatise on corporations. It contains no history of the corporation movement and there is little discussion of the place occupied by the corporation in our modern business life or of the difficult problem of securing its public control in the interest of the people at large. Such supervision as is needed the author seems to believe can be secured by means of publicity and careful accounting. The book is written by a man in thorough sympathy with the idea that the corporation affords the best method of carrying on modern business transactions, and the movement towards corporate consolidation he believes to be in the interest of the public as well as of the investors in corporate securities.

==== Legal character and requirements of the corporation ====
This book is primarily descriptive of the methods of promoting, organizing and financing corporations, and all the illustrations are taken from the experience of American companies. In the first six chapters the author deals with the legal character and requirements of the corporation.

In the chapter about the interior organization Lough goes into the powers and liabilities of directors. Lough started explaining that "in theory, however, even if not in practice, a board of directors is supposed to represent all the stockholders equally. Partly for that reason the board... is given complete control over the corporation's assets and officers." Also in the organization, there is a "centralization of control,' which can be compared to a double pyramid (see image). Lough explained:

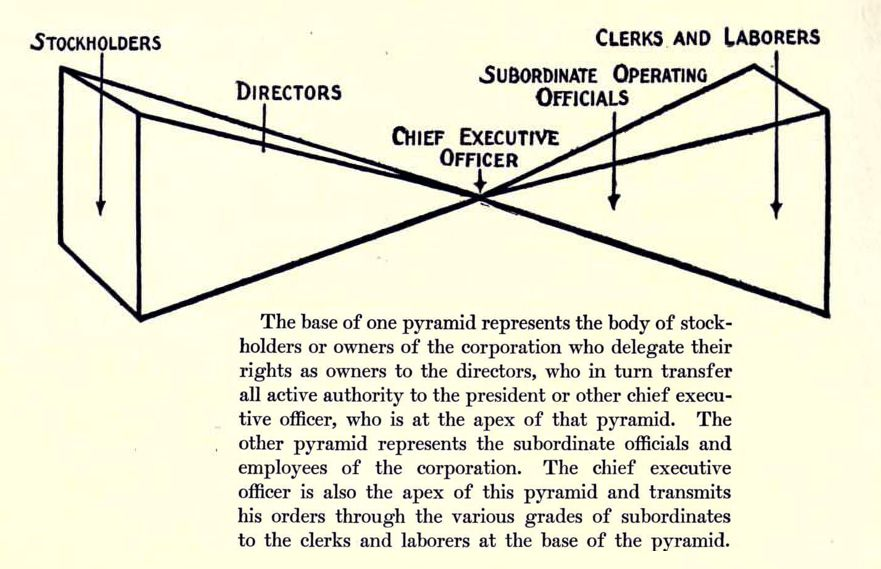
Corporation Finance Pyramid, 1909

The base of one pyramid represents the body of stockholders or owners of the corporation who delegate their rights as owners to the directors, who in turn transfer all active authority to the president or other chief executive officer, who is at the apex of that pyramid. The other pyramid represents the subordinate officials and employees of the corporation. The chief executive officer is also the apex of this pyramid and transmits his orders through the various grades of subordinates to the clerks and laborers at the base of the pyramid. Thus responsibility and authority conferred by the stockholders and exercised over the employees are both centered in this chief executive officer. It is an organization almost ideally adapted, so far as efficiency and economy go, to the conditions of present-day industry.

Overall the first six chapters of the book contains little that is new. It is derived, as the author suggests, largely from Thomas Conyngton's The Modern Corporation (1910). Worthy of notice in this part, however, is the distinction which Professor Lough draws between "the parent company" and "the holding company." Lough stated:

A parent company is one that for some reason does not desire to carry on operations in its own name over the whole country, and which therefore organizes and holds all or nearly all the stock of one or more subordinate companies... A holding company proper on the other hand, using the term in a financial, not a legal sense, comes into existence for the purpose of buying control of pre-existing companies. Its ostensible object is the buying of securities of other corporations to be held for whatever revenues they will produce. The real object of its existence, however, is not accomplished unless it holds control of all its subsidiary companies and directs their operations. Sometimes this control consists in holding a bare majority of the voting stock of the subsidiary; but it is generally advisable to secure as much stock as possible, for the greater the extent of the control, the more readily may the holding company carry out its plans to achieve economies and fix prices.

Lough also noted that "holding companies may be formed, not only to acquire stock of operating companies, but also to obtain control of other holding companies." Such organization can become rather complex, and any examples may require considerable explanation. Lough continued:

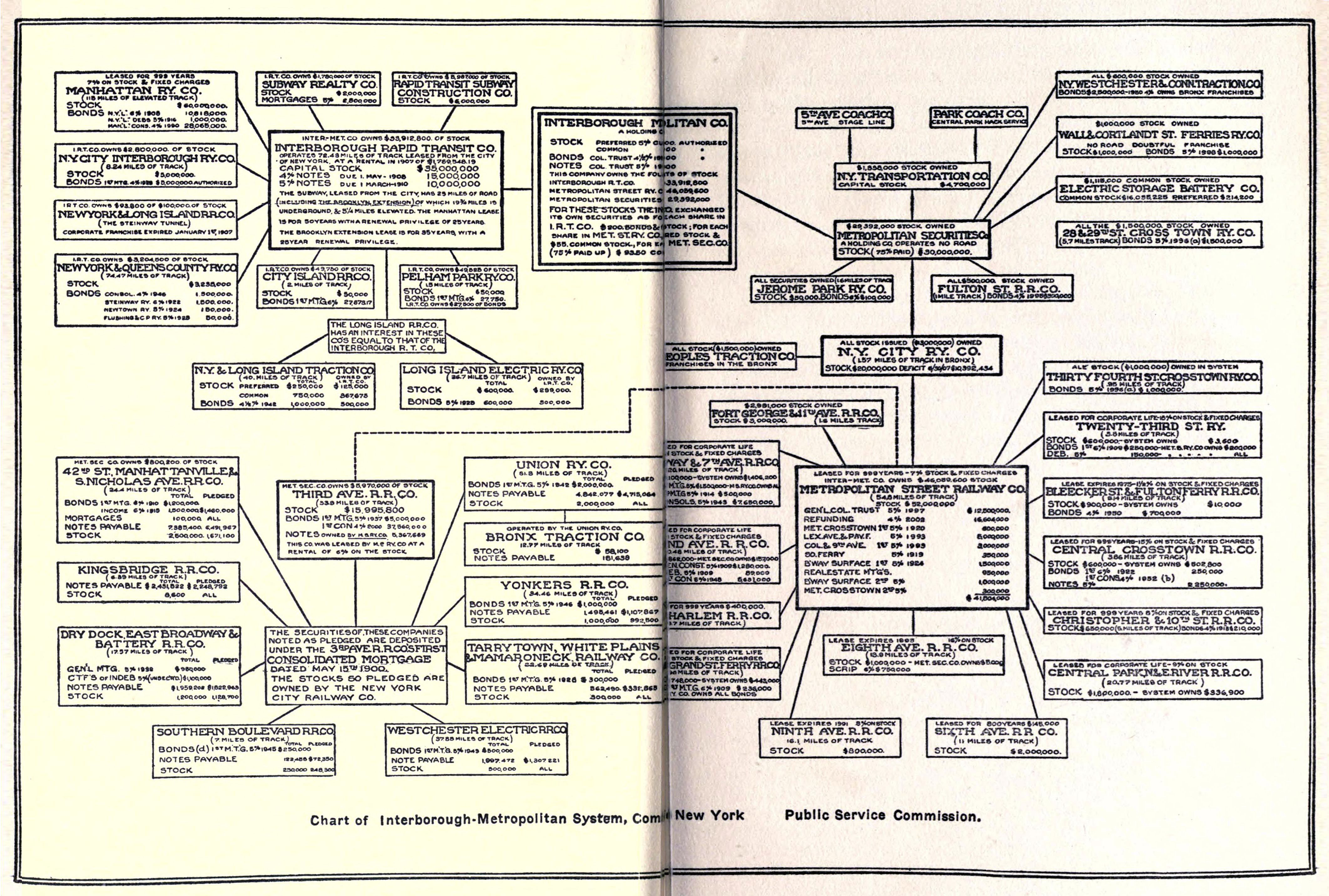
Chart of Interborough-Metropolitan System, New York, 1909

The reader will get a sufficiently clear idea as to how complex organizations of this kind are built up if he will study the accompanying chart of the Interborough-Metropolitan Company, which was prepared for the Public Service Commission of the First District of the State of 'New York. The Interborough-Metropolitan Company controls all the street car, elevated and subway railway lines in the principal boroughs of New York City. It was formed, as shown in the chart, by an exchange of its securities for the securities of two formerly competing companies, the Metropolitan Securities Company and the Interborough Rapid Transit Company. The relations of these two companies to each other, to their direct subsidiaries, and to the subsidiaries of their subsidiaries, are as clearly as possible presented in the chart."

To illustrate further the extent, as well as the complexity, Lough gave a second example of Standard Oil Company with a complete listing of over 100 subsidiaries controlled by the Standard Oil Company of New Jersey.

==== Raising funds, credit instruments and establishing new enterprise ====
Chapters 7-11 of the work deal with the various methods of raising funds and with the credit instruments to which they give rise. The author says: "Only one method of raising funds is cheaper than borrowing and that method is stealing." In view of some recent episodes in corporation finance it is doubtful whether even this exception need have been made. By a study of the balance sheets of several large corporations, the author endeavors to show that failure to borrow largely is a sign of weak and injudicious financial management. Particularly good in this section of the book is the discussion of short time loans.

Chapter 12-15 deal with the work of the promoter in establishing new enterprise, and in consolidating old ones and this section concludes with a chapter on the United States Steel Corporation. In Chapters 16-19 the author describes the four methods of selling securities: by inside distribution; through Wall Street; through bond and brokerage houses; and by means of advertising. The relative advantages of these various methods are discussed.

In chapter 19 Lough explains the working of syndicates, and gives and example of how a new plant was constructed wholly with borrowed funds.

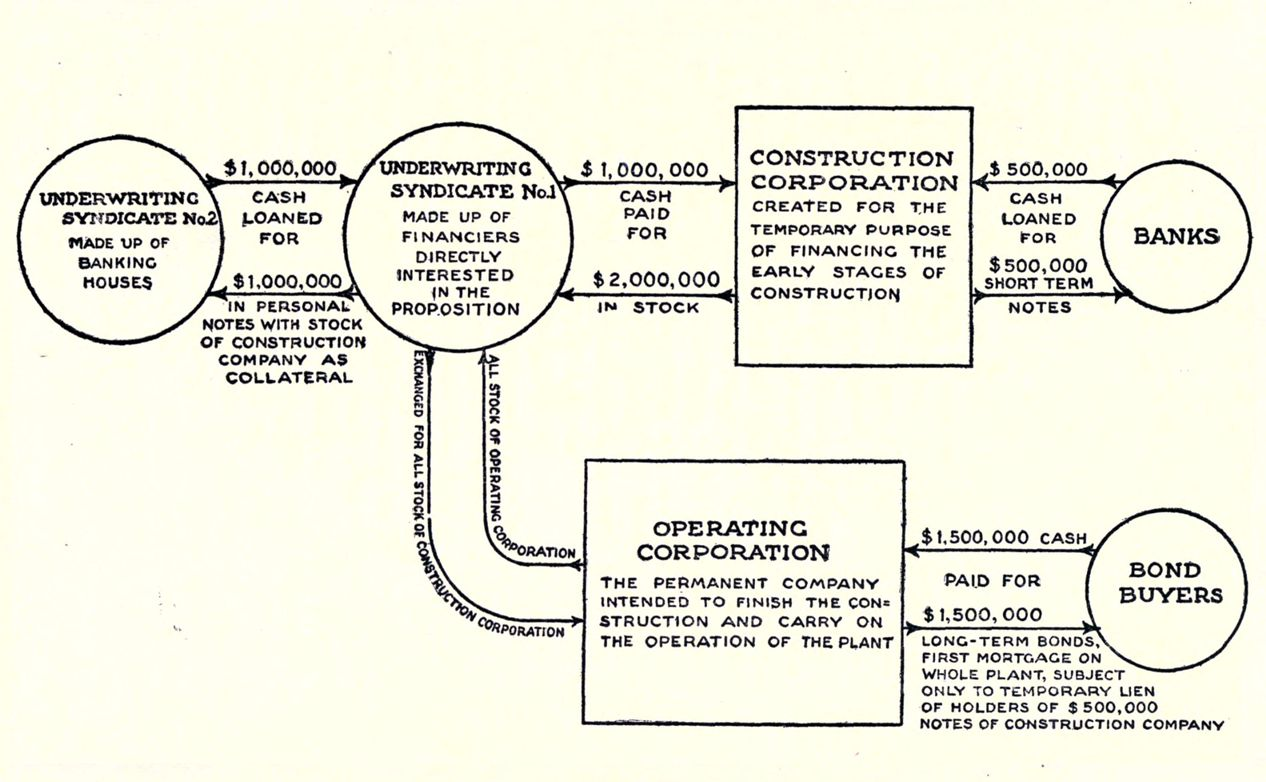
Corporation finance circular flows, 1909

:In the spring of 1902 the promoter of a smelting and refining company in Mexico succeeded in convincing a number of Philadelphia financiers that his proposition was worth looking into. They made a thorough investigation, satisfied themselves that the proposed plant would certainly prove profitable, and undertook to finance its construction. Engineers' estimates called for an expenditure of something over $2,000,000 and a period of three years before the plant would begin to earn expenses. As a matter of fact, the expenditure was approximately $3,000,000 and the construction work was not completed until early in 1907.

A syndicate of Philadelphia and Baltimore capitalists and banking houses was formed to underwrite the enterprise. Next an entirely different syndicate of banking houses was organized, which agreed to take the notes(when issued up to a certain amount) of syndicate No. I, the notes to be secured by the stock of a corporation organized to construct the plant. The corporation was capitalized at $2,000,000, half preferred and half common stock. All its stock was sold to syndicate No. I, for $1,000,000. Syndicate No. I then posted the stock and gave notes to syndicate No. II, who loaned the $1,000,000. Thus syndicate No. I was not called upon for cash, except for expenses, and the construction company was supplied with $1,000,000 with which to begin operations.

Next, after expending the $1,000,000, the construction company issued $500,000 of its own notes, which being its only obligations were accepted by Philadelphia banks... Up to this point one-half the necessary funds had been secured and at the end of two years the work of construction had been more than half completed. Now a new corporation was formed which was to operate the plant. The reader will observe that the first corporation existed simply to carry on construction. The operating corporation at once took over the stock of the construction company, title to which up to this time had remained with syndicate No. I. Then the operating corporation put out a first-mortgage bond issue, based on all its property then owned and thereafter to be constructed, and sold during the next two years $1,500,000 of bonds. In this way the whole $3,000,000 necessary to build the plant was raised by borrowing and the members of syndicate No. I furnished nothing to the enterprise but their credit. The diagram on page 282 will perhaps assist the reader in arriving at a clear understanding of the whole series of transactions.

Lough told about the actual situation, that "the plant at the date of writing has been running a little over two years. Earnings have been more than sufficient to meet all interest charges and other expenses, and it is expected that large profits will be earned in the future..." He ended with explaining, that "it may seem strange that a new plant could thus be constructed wholly with borrowed funds; yet there is nothing especially unusual about the operation. The secret of the success of the syndicate in this instance lay in the fact that they were themselves strong financially and could borrow the first $1,000,000 readily..."

==== Honest financial management and high finance ====
Chapters 20-24 deal with an honest financial management of corporations and discuss some of the difficult problems with which financial managers have to deal; such as the proportion of working capital, betterment expenses, and the handling of the surplus. With reference to betterment expenses Professor Lough is inclined to favor the policy of the Pennsylvania Railroad in providing for those expenses which are bound to result in a permanent saving or profit, by means of bond issues, and for those expenses (like the New York tunnels), which may or may not yield profits in the near future, by appropriations from the surplus.

In chapters 25-37 are revealed the tricks and methods of "high finance." This part of the work the author advises those who are "morally weak" to omit, but they may well be perused by "innocent investors." The various methods of manipulation are classified according as they are carried on by the officers, the directors, or by and for the stock holders. Finally, come three excellent chapters on insolvency and reorganization with illustrations drawn from the financial history of the Santa Fe, the Rock Island and the Westinghouse Electric and Manufacturing Company. About 25 pages of "quiz questions" are given at the end of the book.

Corporation finance is not treated by Professor Lough as a part of economics although closely related to it. His treatment of the subject is much like the German method of treating public finance — a subject somewhat dependent on economics but having its own independent set of principles.

=== Business Finance, A Practical Study of Financial Management in Private Business Concerns, 1917 ===
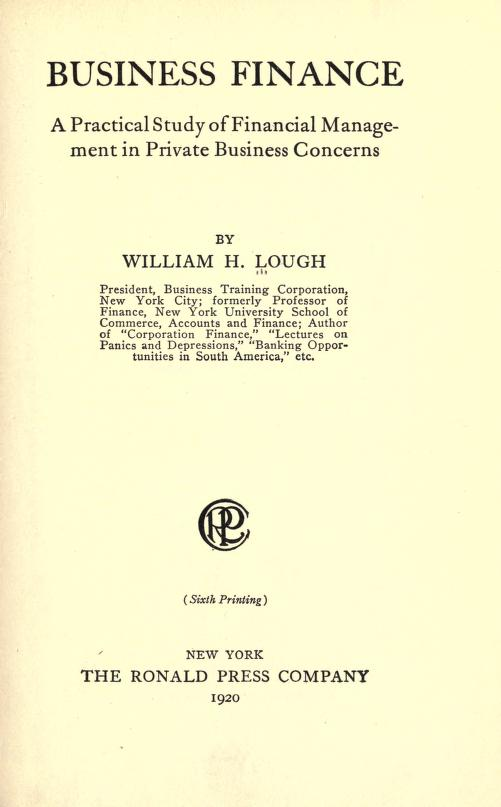
Title page, 1917

A 1918 review of this work by Arthur S. Dewing (1880–1971) stated, that this book represents an important study of modern financial practice, especially with reference to medium-sized industrial corporations. More than the majority of books on corporation finance heretofore published, it seeks to discover what might be called a financial "ought", which differentiates between good and bad financial policies. Everyone knows the fundamental difficulty which brought about the receiverships of the Atchison or the Westinghouse companies. These are stock illustrations. But Lough's insistence that the private corporation should prepare a budget is, in the reviewer's opinion, a new and important contribution.

The book is divided into five parts. The first covers general and well known characteristics of corporations in contradistinction to other forms of enterprise; the second describes the media through which the corporation may secure capital; and the third the practical problems of securing it. Of these three parts the concluding chapter of the second (ch. 8) entitled Basis of Capitalization is the most constructive and worthwhile. Especially important in the haze of present-day attempts to establish a sound basis for public regulation of corporate income is Lough's insistence that earning power, not original investment, is the most rational basis of capitalization. In accordance with this theory one would wish that he had devoted more than a paragraph to the important recent changes in New York and other state laws permitting the issue of stock without par value.

The fourth section entitled Internal Financial Management is the most illuminating in the book. While by no means all accountants would agree with those paragraphs expounding one or another of the various moot problems, still the discussions are all thoroughly sound, albeit savoring more of business expediency than the strict logic of accountancy. The two closing chapters, entitled Budgets and Financial Standards, are particularly suggestive. The subjects treated in the latter have wide economic significance, but the generalizations are somewhat superficial and backed by insufficient empirical evidence. The fifth part, entitled Financial Abuses and Involvements, is distinctly patchwork. It shows the marks of hasty preparation and is the least satisfactory section in the book.

The book contains several inaccuracies. Lough speaks of the "reorganization of the Erie Railroad in 1895" (p. 142) and there was issued at the time "Erie Railroad first consolidated mortgage 7's 1920." The proof reading was not always careful;1889 should read 1899 (p. 171). As a whole, the book shows a wide familiarity with current financial discussion and, above all, great sanity and good judgment. Teachers of corporation finance will find in it a very satisfactory text. From the pedagogical point of view it strikes the happy medium between unjustified generalities and a hopeless maze of detail.

=== High-Level Consumption, 1935 ===
In the 1930s Lough became an authority in the field of Consumer spending. A 1932 report of Retail Trade Board of the Boston Chamber of Commerce for example had noted that Lough had estimated a "total retail sales of consumer goods amounted to about 19 billion dollars in 1914,". while the National Bureau of Economic Research had "estimated total retail sales as 22 billion dollars for that year."

In 1935 Lough with the assistance of Martin Gainsbrugh published "High-Level Consumption", which is considered the first detailed estimates of aggregate consumer expenditures for goods and services in the United States over a period of time. This work was also noted as "the only serious attempts to measure saving of individuals over several years by the balance sheet method." Their pioneer estimates covered the years 1909, 1914, 1919, 1921, 1923, 1925, 1927, 1929, and 1931. The data for the later years were revised and extended by Harold Barger, Outlay and Income in the United States, 1921–1938, National Bureau of Economic Research, New York, 1942. In the 1940s, J. Frederic Dewhurst and Associates (America's Needs and Resources, 1947) revised these various estimates and expanded those on recreational expense to take account of estimates by Julius Weinberger, "The Economic Aspects of Recreation", Harvard Business Review, summer issue, 1937.

In 1935, estimates of aggregate consumer expenditures in detail for 1909 and 1929 and selected years between were prepared by Martin Gainsbrugh and published in William H. Lough, HighLevel Consumption... This book included a comparison with The Brookings Institution's aggregates for 1929, showing that the two estimates were very close for food expense, and reasonably close for attire and home maintenance; but the estimates by Lough and Gainsbrugh of expenditures for all other items were much higher than the Brookings' figures.

== Selected publications ==
- William H. Lough Jr. Corporation finance; an exposition of the principles and methods governing the promotion, organization and management of modern corporations. Chicago : De Bower-Elliott, 1909.
- Lough, William Henry. Banking Opportunities in South America. US Government Printing Office, 1915.
- Lough, William H. Business Finance, A Practical Study of Financial Management in Private Business Concerns. 1917; 1920.
- Lough, William H., and Martin R. Gainsborough. High-Level Consumption. (1935).
