= Jacob Anton De Haas =

American economist (1883–1963)

Jacob Anton De Haas (Amsterdam, February 3, 1883 – 1963) was a Dutch-American business economist, and professor of business management and accountancy at the Nederlandsche Handels-Hoogeschool in Rotterdam from 1919 to 1921.

From 1927 on, he was professor at Harvard University for the rest of his career. He was known as an expert in international trade.

== Lifecycle ==
=== Youth, education and first career steps ===
De Haas was born in Amsterdam in 1883 as the son of Jacob de Haas and Antonia (Bemond) de Haas. He grew up in Amsterdam, where he went through primary and secondary education. For his studies he went to the United States, where he studied at Stanford and Harvard. In 1901 he received his AB degree from Stanford, in 1912 his master's degree from Harvard, and in 1915 he was promoted back to Stanford.

De Haas started his working life in 1914 as special agent for the California Commission of Immigration. From 1915 to 1917 he was deputy professor at the University of Texas, and from 1919 to 1921 he was professor of business studies and accountancy at the Nederlandsche Handels-Hoogeschool in Rotterdam. His teaching assignment was "business theory, in particular the technique of trade, account science".

=== Further career ===
In 1921, De Haas left for the United States, where he had received US nationality in 1917. He first became a professor at the University of Washington, and professor of foreign trade at New York University. In 1927 he received a permanent appointment as a professor at Harvard University. In addition, he was a professor at the US Naval War College from 1928.

In the Second World War, De Haas was a consultant at the American War Department in 1940–41, and from 1941 to 1943 at the Office of Coordinator of Inter-American Affairs. He was appointed chairman of the Economic Division of the Netherlands Post-war Planning Committee here in 1942. After the war, he and prof. J.A.C. Fagginger Auer got an award from the Dutch government for "the fact that they had already made preparations during the war to bystand the Dutch universities and colleges in the reconstruction of their equipment."

De Haas published over the years various books on international trade, the parties involved, trading techniques and cartel formation.

=== Personal relations ===
De Haas married Hazel Gertrude Carus on December 25, 1914, who died on April 12, 1922. On December 28, 1922, he remarried with Emily Haver.

== Publications ==
- Jacob Anton De Haas. Foreign trade and shipping, New York, Alexander Hamilton institute, 1919.
- Jacob Anton De Haas. Foreign trade organization. 1919.
- De Haas, J. Anton (Jacob Anton), Business organization and administration, New York, Chicago [etc.] The Gregg publishing company, 1920.
- Jacob Anton De Haas. Veranderingen in de handelstechniek. 1923.
- Jacob Anton De Haas. The Practice of Foreign Trade: A Textbook. McGraw-Hill Book Company, Incorporated, 1935.
- Jacob Anton De Haas. International cartels in the postwar world. 1944.

== Archives and records ==
- Jacob Anton de Hass papers at Baker Library Special Collections, Harvard Business School.
