= Adolph Matz =

German/American accountant

- Born: Adolph Matz; 25 April 1905; Karlsruhe, Germany
- Died: October 1, 1986 (aged 81); Blue Bell, Pennsylvania, U.S.
- Education: Wharton School of the University of Pennsylvania (BA)
- Scientific career
- Fields: Organizational theory Accounting
- Workplaces: Wharton School of the University of Pennsylvania

Adolph Matz (April 25, 1905 – October 1, 1986) was a German/American organizational theorist, and Professor of Accounting at the Wharton School of the University of Pennsylvania, known for his work on cost accounting.

== Life and work ==
Matz was born in Karlsruhe or Heidelberg, Germany and started his studies in Weimar Republic. In the early 1930s he came to the United States, and obtained the American citizenship in 1933. He obtained his BA in 1932 at the Wharton School of the University of Pennsylvania, where he also obtained his MA in 1933 and his PhD in 1937. He started his academic career at the Wharton School of the University of Pennsylvania, and became Professor of Accounting.

Matz is noted for his 1946 prediction, that "completion of the first all-electronic general-purpose computing machine [would open] the future to the development of business machines heretofore undreamed of... and may well also revolutionize methods and systems of dealing with everyday business transactions." These ideas were however dismissed as "too ephemeral," and his article initially rejected.

Matz died October 1, 1986, in Blue Bell, Montgomery County, Pennsylvania.

== Selected publications ==
- Matz, Adolph, Othel J. Curry, and George W. Frank. Cost Accounting: Management's Operational Tool for Planning, Control, and Analysis. South-Western, 1962.
- Matz, Adolph, and M. F. Usry. Cost Accounting, Planning and Control South. western Publishing Co (1984).

Articles, a selection:

- Matz, Adolph. "Accounting as a tool for economy in German business." Accounting Review (1940): 177-185.
- Matz, Adolph. "Electronics in Accounting." Accounting Review (1946): 371-379.
- Adolph Matz. "A Bibliography of Cost Accounting: Its Origins and Development to 1914, 2 Vols. by M. C. Wells," The Accounting Historians Journal, Vol. 8, No. 2 (Fall 1981), pp. 129–133.
