= Esbjörn Segelod =

Swedish organizational theorist

Esbjörn Segelod (born 1951) is a Swedish organizational theorist and Professor in Business Administration at the Mälardalen University College, School of Business Society and Engineering. He is best known for his work on "knowledge in the software development process" and "software innovativeness"

== Life and work ==
Segelod obtained his PhD at the University of Gothenburg in 1986 with the thesis, entitled "Kalkylering och avvikelser : empiriska studier av stora projekt i kommuner och industri" (Capital expenditure planning and planning deviations).

After graduation Segelod started his academic career at the University of Gothenburg. In the late 1980s Segelod moved to the Uppsala University, where he was affiliated with its Företagsekonomiska institutionen (Institute for Business Administration). In the late 1990s Segelod was appointed Professor in Business Administration at the Mälardalen University College

Segelod's research interest have broadened over the years, focussing on topics as "sophisticated methods of capital budgeting" in the 1980s, "corporate control of investments" in the 1990s, to the "software development process" and "software innovativeness" in the new millennium.

== Selected publications ==
- Segelod, Esbjörn. Capital investment appraisal: towards a contingency theory. Chartwell Bratt, 1991.
- Segelod, Esbjörn. Renewal through internal development. Avebury, 1995.

Articles, a selection:

- Segelod, Esbjörn. "Capital budgeting in a fast-changing world." Long Range Planning 31.4 (1998): 529-541.
- Segelod, Esbjörn. "A comparison of managers’ perceptions of short-termism in Sweden and the US." International Journal of Production Economics 63.3 (2000): 243-254.
- Segelod, Esbjörn, and Gary Jordan. "The use and importance of external sources of knowledge in the software development process." R&D Management 34.3 (2004): 239-252.
- Jordan, Gary, and Esbjörn Segelod. "Software innovativeness: outcomes on project performance, knowledge enhancement, and external linkages." R&D Management 36.2 (2006): 127-142.
- Segelod, Esbjörn, and Leif Carlsson. "The emergence of uniform principles of cost accounting in Sweden 1900–36." Accounting, Business & Financial History 20.3 (2010): 327-363.
