= Skull & Keys =

Honor society at the University of California, Berkeley

- Founded: 1892; 134 years ago University of California, Berkeley
- Type: Senior society
- Affiliation: Independent
- Status: Defunct
- Defunct date: 1980
- Scope: Local
- Chapters: 1
- Headquarters: Berkeley, California; United States

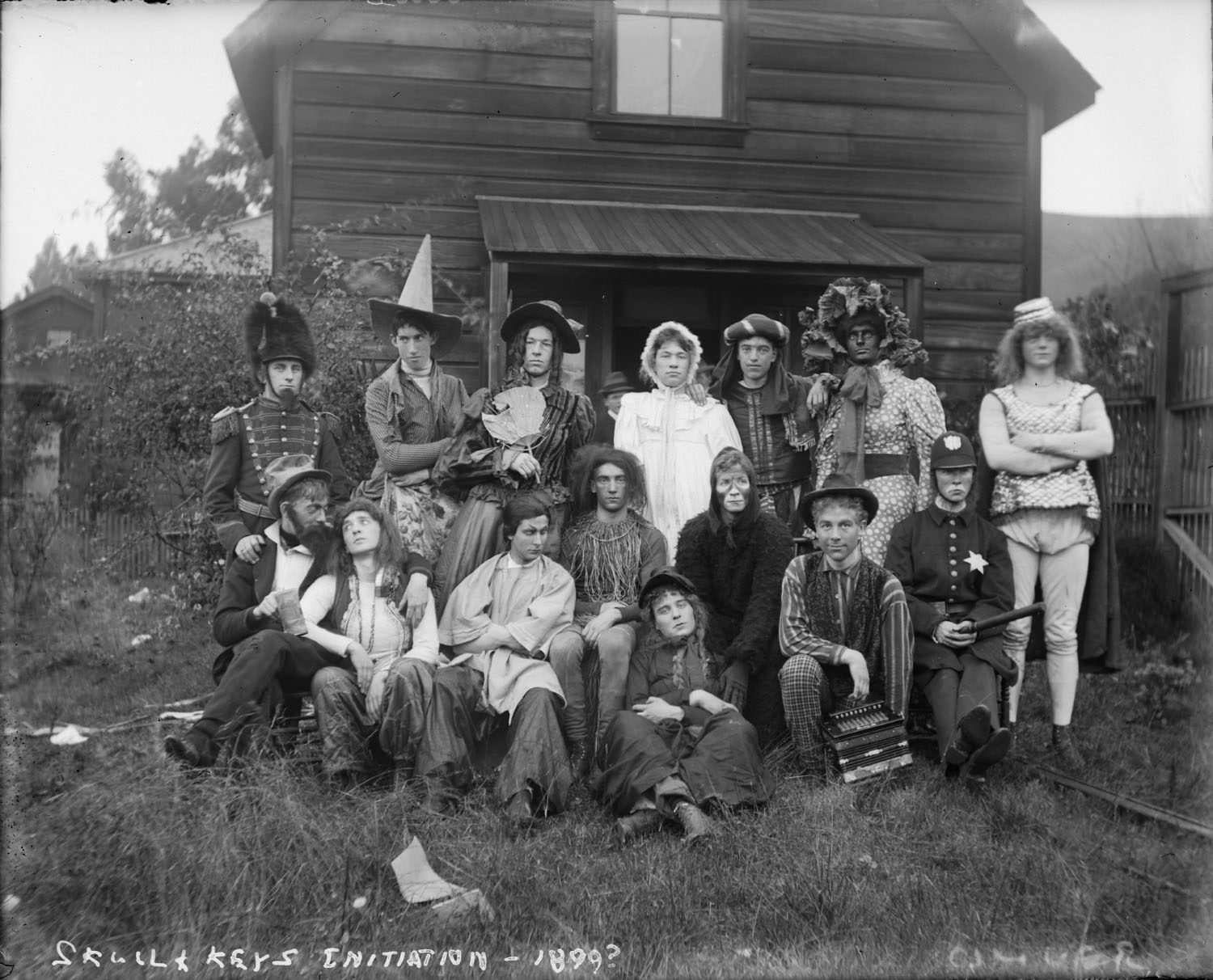
Skull & Keys initiation Running, circa 1899

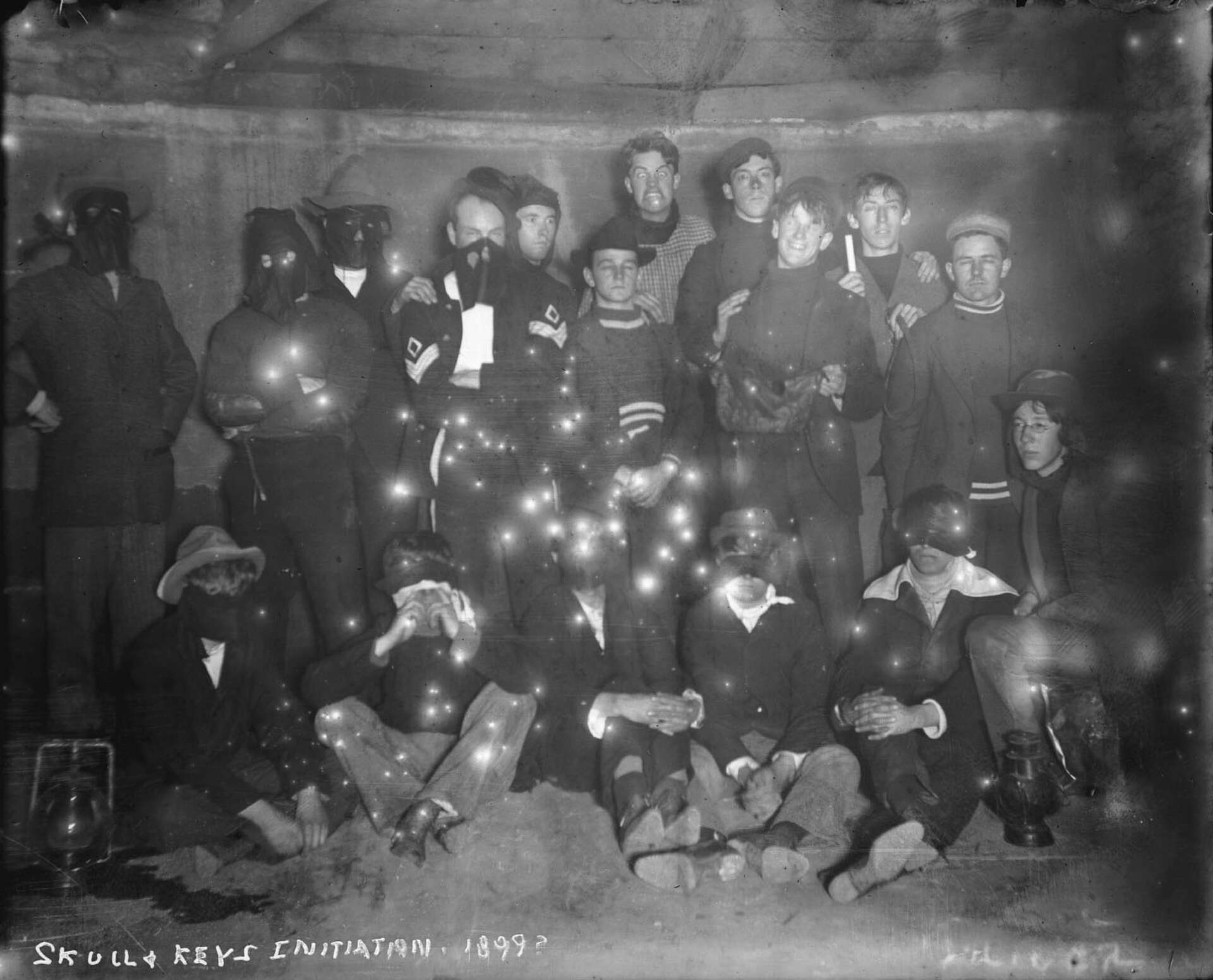
Skull & Keys initiation, Night, circa 1899

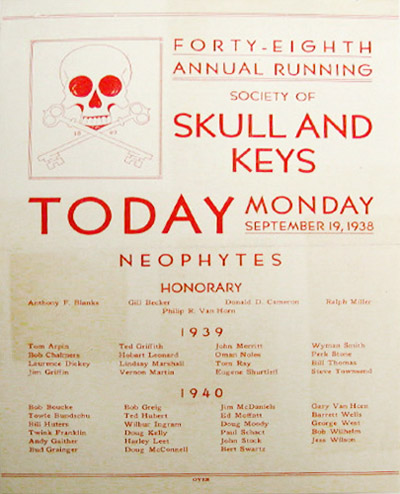
Advertisement for the Running, 1938

Skull & Keys was a men's honor society at the University of California, Berkeley in Berkeley, California. The organization was started by Theta Nu Epsilon. Skull & Keys was the first of several collegiate secret societies that formed from the fraternity system at Berkeley.

== History ==
The Zeta chapter of Theta Nu Epsilon was founded at the University of California, Berkeley as a sophomore society in 1881. In 1882, Skull & Keys was founded as a senior society for members of Theta Nu Epsilon. Many of the fraternity's members had an affiliation with Yale and intended to hold "tap day", following the traditions of Yale. One of its founders was Frank Norris who wrote the ritual and ceremonies for Skull & Keys.

In 1912, Skull & Keys built its lodge or “Tomb” off campus at Le Conte and Euclid. In 1960, the adjacent Church Divinity School of the Pacific purchased the Skull & Keys’ Tomb property, agreeing to build the society a new Tomb at 2436 Prospect Street. Despite complaints from residents its new neighborhood, the group proceeded with construction of its 35 by 35 feet (11 by 11 m) new Tomb. There, the group was known for drunken debauchery.

Because the Tomb was off-campus and Skull & Bones was not sanctioned by the university, there was little the university could do. Instead, the people who lived near the Tomb worked with the city which finally closed the building for being a public nuisance and environmental health violations. In addition, the city fined the group $750 ($2862 in today's money) for cleaning up “beer bottles, cans, vomit, urine, and other filth.” However, the city's padlock and closure notice did not keep the Skull & Bones members out of the Tomb and they resumed their parties as usual. After the city boarded up the building, the group eventually gave up by 1980.

However, as of 2021, the Tomb property is still owned by Skull & Keys Inc., the holding company incorporated in 1912 when the first Tomb was constructed.

== Activities ==
Much of the society's practices, members, and traditions were kept secret. It met semi-monthly in a facility known as the Tomb. It was led by the Uncle, who was elected by a voice vote of the active members.

== Membership ==
Skull & Keys members were recruited from the senior and junior classes of the University of California, Berkeley. Initiates participated in an initiation ritual known as the Running. Originally, the Running involved dress suits with duck trousers. Later, this public event involved the new members in various costumes, many of which were offensive drawing reproach from the university.

== Notable members ==
- Tom Bates, mayor of Berkeley
- Frank Norris, journalist and novelist
