= Senior Skull Honor Society =

Honor society at University of Maine, US

- Founded: December 14, 1906; 119 years ago University of Maine
- Type: Senior society
- Affiliation: Independent
- Status: Active
- Scope: Local
- Chapters: 1
- Members: 1250+ lifetime
- Headquarters: Orono, Maine; United States

The Senior Skull Society is an American collegiate senior honor society at the University of Maine in Orono, Maine. Membership in the society is "the highest all-inclusive honor" at the university.

== History ==
The Senior Skull Honor Society was founded on December 14, 1906, by eleven men of various fraternities. Its purpose was to recognize and reward service to the university and to encourage leadership, scholarship, and citizenship within the campus community. In 1911, it created the Sophomore Owls to watch over and discipline freshmen. The group also oversaw and approval all student groups. In 1913, the society's president called a meeting of campus fraternites and established an interfraternity council.

During World War II, the society ceased to exist for three years but has operated continuously since its reformation in the fall of 1947. The society promotes the values of friendship, obligation, academics, dignity, and the standards and traditions of the University of Maine.

== Activities ==
The society plans homecoming activities and selects the university's homecoming court. Its members pass at free drinks to students in line for sporting events and plan senior class activities. It also serves as a liaison between students and the university administration and performs duties assigned by the university president and alumni association. In 2006, the society endowed a scholarship with the University of Maine to celebrate its centennial anniversary.

== Membership ==
The Senior Skull Honor Society is not a secret society and regularly announces its new members. A typical class of members is nine or ten male students. Members are selected for their academic achievement, character, involvement with the campus and community, and leadership. The society also invites notable alumni into its membership. As of 2006, it has initiated 1,250 members.

== Notable members ==
- Raymond H. Fogler, Class of 1915
