= Alfred John Liversedge =

British engineer, manager, and author

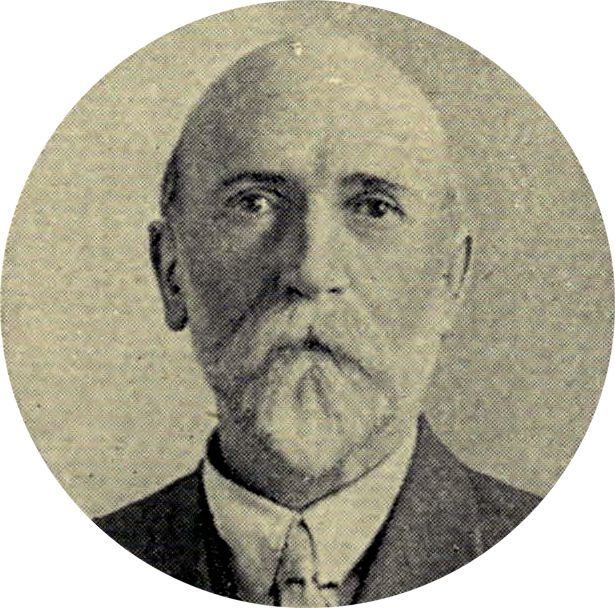
Alfred John Liversedge, 1900

Alfred John Liversedge (Huddersfield, 1854 – Croydon, 20 August 1934) was a British engineer, manager, and author, known from the 1889 publication "Engineering Estimates, Costs and Accounts," written under the pseudonym "A general manager." This work was one of the seminal works in the field of cost accounting.

== Biography ==
Liversedge came into prominence with the publication of "Engineering Estimates, Costs and Accounts." in 1889, which he wrote under the pseudonym "A general manager." Late 19th century he was elected Fellow of the Royal Society of Arts. He became editor of "The Engineering Supplement" of the Daily Mail Overseas Edition, and made contributions to the Harmsworth's Universal Encyclopaedia, Chambers's Encyclopaedia, The Times,, The International Journal of Commerce, The Fortnightly Review, and The Waverley pictorial dictionary published in 1900.

Liversedge settled in Croydon, Surrey, was elected associate member of the Institution of Civil Engineers in 1900, and also was elected member of the Society of Chemical Industry.

In the years from 1908 to 1912 Liversedge published a series of 82 articles on cost accounting in The Mechanical World of Manchester, again under the pseudonym 'A general manager.' This series was in 1912 republished in book form as Commercial Engineering.. and his identity was revealed.

== Work ==
=== Engineering Estimates, Costs and Accounts, 1889 ===
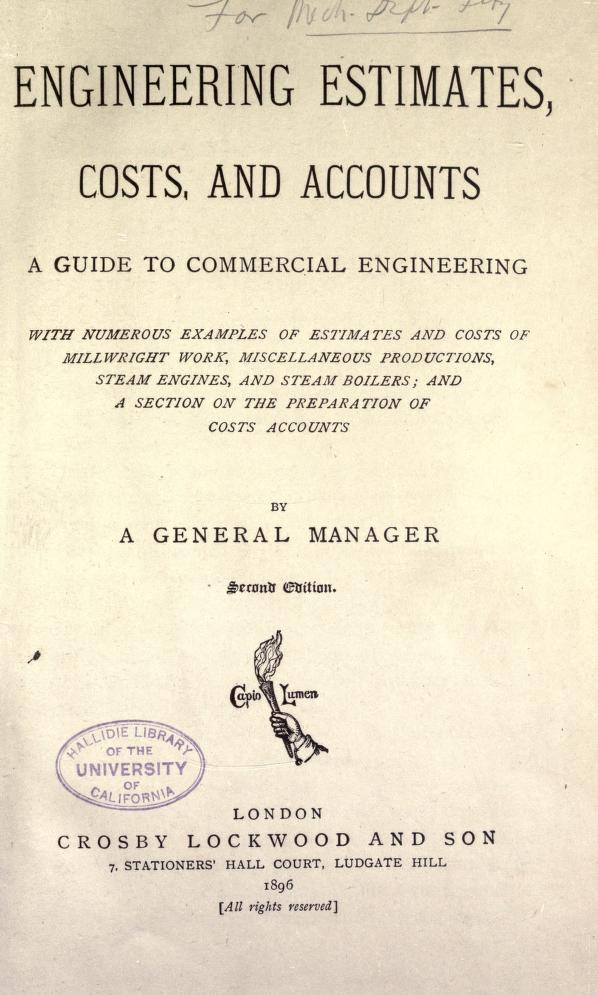
Engineering Estimates, Costs and Accounts; by A general manager, 1896

Liversedge came into prominence with the publication of "Engineering Estimates, Costs and Accounts." in 1889, which he wrote under the pseudonym "A general manager." This work was published in at least 3 editions, and was first published as a series of articles in the Mechanical Engineering magazine. Hugo Diemer (1904) further explained:

This work is intended primarily as an aid to persons called upon to make estimates of costs of manufacture. There are some parts of the work that contain matter of considerable suggestive value to those having to do with running cost accounts. Several chapters are devoted to a discussion of methods of rapidly estimating quantities of material and time required for labor. A chapter on indirect expenses and their departmental distribution, although short, contains sound principles which may be applied to advantage in a further expansion of this important phase of manufacturing accounts.
A great number of specific examples of estimates follow, covering almost every class of machine-shop and millwright work. The last chapter is devoted to costs' bookkeeping. Here again the best part of the discussion is that having to do with indirect expenses. A criticism, of the methods described would be that there are too many bound volumes, many of which would be better replaced by loose-leaf or card systems. Again, dependence is made upon the workmen themselves for entries of labor, and upon records of storeroom boys as to material consumed, without any check as to the correctness of such draft at the time of issuing stores. The value of the book is in its discussion of the process and methods of estimating rather than in any contribution to the science of cost-keeping.

More recently when discussing his second book "Commercial Engineering" published in 1912 Morgen Witzel (2012) explained, that "much of this work is a discussion of factors of production, particularly labour and capital and how they function, along with information about the business environment."

== Reception ==
Wells (1977) noted, that "although they covered the same subject matter, the books of Garcke and Fells and A.J. Liversedge were both said by their authors to be the first book to deal with factory or engineers cost records."

According to Brech (1957) Liversedge was one of the British pioneers, whose work helped establish the field of production engineering in the 1920s. Millerson (1964) explained:

During the 1914–18 war, accelerated expansion of production methods caused a new branch of engineering to emerge — production engineering. This was based on the theory and techniques contributed by the work of F. B. Gilbreth and F. W. Taylor in the U.S.A., J. Slater Lewis and A. J. Liversedge in England, and Henri Fayol in France. At the end of 1920, H. E. Horner wrote to 'Engineering Production' proposing an organization for engineers specializing in manufacturing processes. Correspondence developed, interest led to a plan, and the 'Institution of Production Engineers' was inaugurated in February 1921...

According to Urwick & Brech (1959) particularly Liversedge's Commercial Engineering from 1912 "may be regarded from a historical point of view, as a further stage in the evolution of management as a subject of study." In the new millennium Brech (2003) summarised the raise of British approaches to management as follows:

In the two decades prior to World War I, a number of British writers and consultants had begun to address the problems of management in the modern world. Although they were aware of similar developments in America, where scientific management was becoming the latest business fashion, these writers sought to develop distinctly British approaches to management. Writers such as the engineers Joseph Slater Lewis, A.J. Liversedge and F.G. Burton, the consultants Edward Elbourne and J.W. Stannard, and the accountant Lawrence Dicksee laid stress on the need for a methodical approach to business management, the need to be inclusive and to motivate workers to see the company's goals as their own, and above all the need for more and better training for would-be managers... [Their work shows] the directions in which British management thinking might have gone had not World War I and the subsequent "Americanization" of British industry intervened. Today, they remain an important example of an alternative way of thinking about and practising management, and demonstrate the plurality and diversity of management thought...

== Selected publications ==
- 1889. Engineering Estimates, Costs and Accounts by A general manager (A.J. Liversedge). Crosby, Lockwood & Sons. 2nd ed. 1890; 3rd ed. 1896.
- 1904. Memorandum on the Utilisation of Tidal Power in the Estuary of the Severn
- 1912. Commercial Engineering. By "A general manager" (A. J. Liversedge).

Articles, a selection

- Liversedge, A. J. "The Nile dam at Assouan," in: Cassier's Magazine: An Engineering Monthly, Vol, 21. 1902. p. 139-146
- Liversedge, A. J. "Training of Engineering Foremen and Works Managers." London, 1916. in: Mechanical World, Vol. 59, pp. 208, 250–251, 276, 317–318; Vol. 60, pp. 44, 68–69, 140–141, 160.
