= Francis G. Burton =

British engineer (1840–1915)

Francis George Burton (1840 – 19 September 1915) was a British engineer, incorporated accountant and general manager of the Milford Haven Shipbuilding and Engineering Co. in Pembroke Dock, Wales, known for his early works in the management accounting.

== Life and work ==
Burton was born in Preston, Lancashire, in the first half of 1840 and baptised 12 June 1840. He was secretary and general manager of the Milford Haven Shipbuilding and Engineering Co.. This iron shipbuilding company, located in Pembroke Dock, Wales, was founded by naval architect Edward James Reed in 1874. The company was noted for building the Japanese ironclad Hiei, which was launched June 1877. On the ship yard several merchant ships were built, and also HMS Acorn, a Mariner-class composite screw sloop launched in 1884. While the Royal dockyards revived, the Milford Haven Shipbuilding and Engineering Co. declined, and was resolved in 1890. Burton started working as incorporated accountant settled in Manchester with he founded the accountancy firm Burton & Disley.

Late 19th century Burton came into prominence as author of several books on cost accounting. His Commercial Management of Engineering Works (1899) and works such as Garcke and Fells' Factory accounts, their principles and practice (1887/89), and J. Slater Lewis' Commercial Organization of Factories (1896) are considered the seminal works, which helped establish the new discipline of cost accounting in Britain.

== Work ==
=== The Commercial Management of Engineering Works, (1899) ===
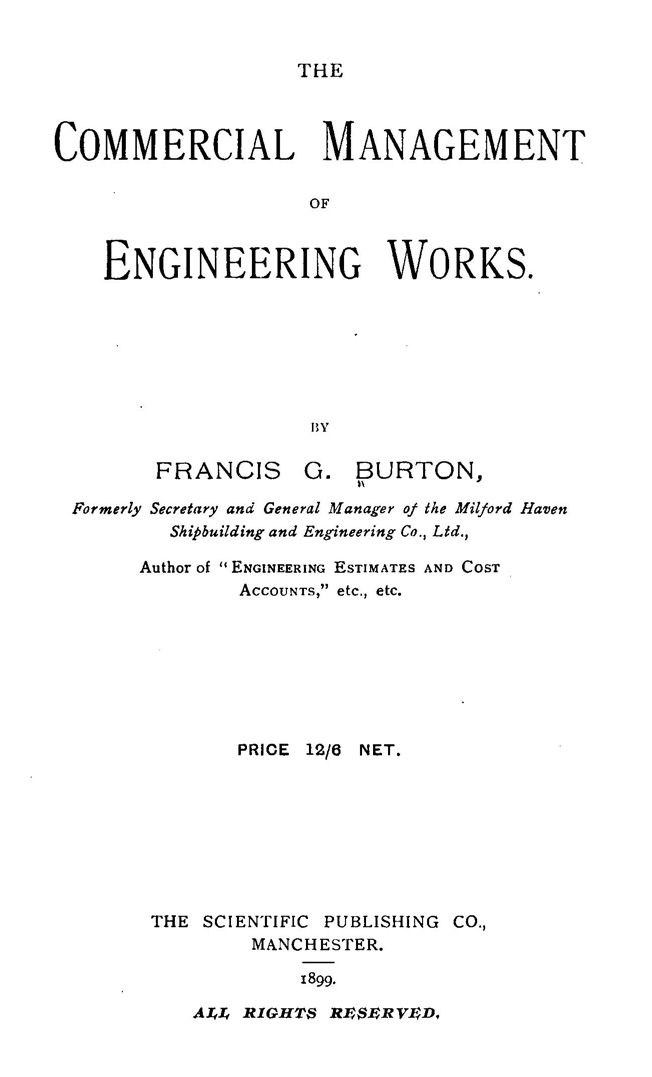
The Commercial Management of Engineering Works, 1899

In the preface of The Commercial Management of Engineering Works, Burton stated that "this work is intended primarily for young engineers. Its object is to present to these young men the problems that are likely to confront them, when commercial duties are thrust upon them, and to offer suggestions that may be of assistance. The work does not claim to represent the results of any scientific research in any special field of factory organization or administration."

Burton foresaw a special role for the professional accountant in the process of bookkeeping and formation of cost accounts:

The best method of financial bookkeeping, one that admits of perfect balancing, should always be adopted; but this does not debar such variations as will fit it for the business to which it relates, or the special requirements of the proprietor or manager. There is no insuperable difficulty in making these variations if the staff be properly trained. The great difference between the professional accountant and his clerks, and ordinary commercial bookkeepers is that the former are trained to think, whereas the latter are taught, and often only permitted, to slavishly follow example. Yet alike in methods of bookkeeping, in formation of cost accounts, in details of office arrangements, in management of men, and in distribution of profits, there must be such variations as will fit those methods to the peculiar circumstances of the individual firm. There must, on the one hand, be no want of system, no imperfect recording of accounts or statistics; and on the other there must be no sacrifice of the substance to the shadow : no abandonment of necessary particulars to the fanciful exigency of interlocking them with a balance-sheet.

Burton summarised that he had "sought to indicate the manner in which the clerical staff may be made to render valuable services to their employers, without encroaching upon the work of the technical officers, or assuming duties and authority for which they are not qualified."

=== Brains of the firm ===
An 1899 review of the book in The Engineer magazine commented, that "Mr. Burton's knowledge on certain branches of the commercial management of engineering works is undoubtedly considerable; and when he deals with book-keeping, auditing, and general office system, its remarks are to the point, and of some value. He tries, however, to do too much; and he deals with many phases of engineering business with which he is apparently but slightly conversant."

The 1899 review gave one example of its inconsistency:

A strange argument adopted in a book professedly dealing with an engineering subject is that to be an engineer is not at all necessary to the satisfactory conducting of an engineering business. According to Mr. Burton, "the directors and secretary, the auditor, and the general manager form the brains of the firm." It is not necessary, however, that a single one of the above should be an engineer in the proper sense of the word; and while brains are undoubtedly a useful commodity in persons holding these positions, we fail to see why the officials just named should be accredited with a larger amount of brain power than, let us say, the works manager, or the chief of the drawing-office; nor can we see bow it would be possible to carry on satisfactorily engineering works under brainless shop management, and from designs emanating from brainless draughtsmen.

The more interesting parts of this work, according to the review, are the chapters on: 'The Directors and Secretary,' 'The Auditor,' 'The Purchases and Inspection of Machinery,' 'Receipt of Materials and Passing of Invoices,' 'Cost Accounts,' 'The Preparation of Estimates,' 'Drawing office Orders for Work,' 'Alternative Plans for Registering and Filing Drawings,' 'Wages Accounts,' 'Cost Accounts,' 'Profit and Loss,' and 'Stocktaking.'

The review eventually concluded that "Mr. Burton has, in short, worked out very carefully in his book a system of his own for what he considers to be the best means of conducting an engineering business; and as far as the purely clerical side of the question is concerned, he has done it well enough."

=== Scientific management ===
Burton's work is noted as "perhaps the first detailed account of the Taylor system in Britain. Among other things, Burton discussed functional foremanship, scientific rate-fixing and the differential piece-rate system."

== Reception ==
Brech (2003) summarised the raise of British approaches to management and the role of Burton:

In the two decades prior to World War I, a number of British writers and consultants had begun to address the problems of management in the modern world. Although they were aware of similar developments in America, where scientific management was becoming the latest business fashion, these writers sought to develop distinctly British approaches to management. Writers such as the engineers Joseph Slater Lewis, A.J. Liversedge and F.G. Burton, the consultants Edward Elbourne and J.W. Stannard, and the accountant Lawrence Dicksee laid stress on the need for a methodical approach to business management, the need to be inclusive and to motivate workers to see the company's goals as their own, and above all the need for more and better training for would-be managers... [Their work shows] the directions in which British management thinking might have gone had not World War I and the subsequent "Americanization" of British industry intervened. Today, they remain an important example of an alternative way of thinking about and practising management, and demonstrate the plurality and diversity of management thought.

== Selected publications ==
- Francis G. Burton. Engineering Estimates and Cost Accounts. (1896/1900)
- Francis G. Burton. The Naval Engineer and the Command of the Sea: A Story of Naval Administration. Manchester: Technical Publishing Co., 1896.
- Francis G. Burton. The Commercial Management of Engineering Works. (1899)
- Francis G. Burton. Engineers' and Shipbuilders' Accounts. (1902)

Article, a selection:

- Burton, F.G. (1901) "Cost accounts," The Incorporated Accountants' Journal, March: 115-20.
