= Edward Francis Leopold Brech =

British management consultant and author

Edward Francis Leopold Brech (26 February 1909 – 22 September 2006) was a British management consultant, and author of management theory and practice books, known for his work on the history of management.

== Life and work ==
Brech was born in Kennington to a Hungarian father, who worked as catering manager, and a Bavarian mother. After grammar school, Brech was selected by the Roman Catholic bishop of Southwark to be educated as priest. At that time there was a pilot scheme, that required a university graduation before entering the church. In 1929 Brech obtained his BA in humanities at the London University, declined priesthood, and continued to study economics at London University obtaining his BA in 1932. At the age of 85 Brech earned his doctorate in British management history through Britain's Open University, where he also was a visiting research fellow. In 2004 he was awarded a higher doctorate (DLitt) for his historical research.

Brech started working in 1929 at a fur trader, and became tutor at the German Commercial school in London. In 1939 he joined the management consulting firm Urwick Orr and Partners (now the Urwick Group), after he had started co-operating with Lyndall Urwick. Urwick was in those days one of the most influential management writer in Britain. From 1945 to 1948 they published their most important work, entitled The making of scientific management.

Since 1947 Brech was engaged in management training for the British Industry, starting at Urwick-Orr with developing syllabus for a national management training. In 1965 he became founding chief executive of the Construction Industry Training Board (CITB), a government initiative based on the 1964 Industrial Training Act to educate, improve skills and set standards for the construction industry. In 1971 Brech moved into industry, and became chairman of a general engineering plastic assemblies business in Yorkshire. In 1974 he co-founded the Executive Leasing company, one of the first organisation interim management.

Since the 1940s he has been researching, publishing, and lecturing on management and its history, and continued to do so after his retirement. Among his best-known works are The Making of Scientific Management, co-authored with Lyndall Urwick in 1940, and The Evolution of Modern Management in Britain 1832–1979, a comprehensive five-volume history published in 2002.

== Work ==
Brech and his friend Peter Drucker had a common believe, that "management was for the good of society, and integrity was its cornerstone." For over 60 years brech developed his ideas about management into training programmes and textbooks.

=== Making of Scientific Management, 1945 ===
In 1945, Urwick and Brech made their most lasting contribution to management literature with the publication of his three-volume Making of Scientific Management. It was the first treatise to present a clear and focused discussion of the development and applications of management science. It included a comprehensive number of profiles of leading proponents of management theory, from early pioneers such as Charles Babbage and Frederick Winslow Taylor, to those such as Seebohm Rowntree and Mary Parker Follett who innovated and refined their concepts.

All aimed to bring '"adequate intelligence" to the control of the forces released by a mechanised economy' to bring the logical standards of science to bear on business practice. It also dealt with early contributions to understanding the scientific approach to control in industry. A long background of scientific management practices had previously been largely unknown before publication of these volumes. The study included a view of methods of control at the famous Boulton and Watt Foundry, of Robert Owen's approach to personnel management, and of commercial management training.

==== Vol 2. Management in British Industry, 1946 ====
The second part of "The making of scientific management," entitled "Management in British Industry" described management in Britain from the Industrial Revolution to the 20th century developments of scientific management and human factors in management. Beside general chapters, there were specific chapters on the work of the Boulton and Watt foundry; on Robert Owen; on J. Slater Lewis, and on F.W. Taylor.

==== Vol 3. The Hawthorne Investigations, 1948 ====
In the preface of "The making of scientific management: Vol 3. The Hawthorne Investigations," Elton Mayo (1947) acknowledged, that:

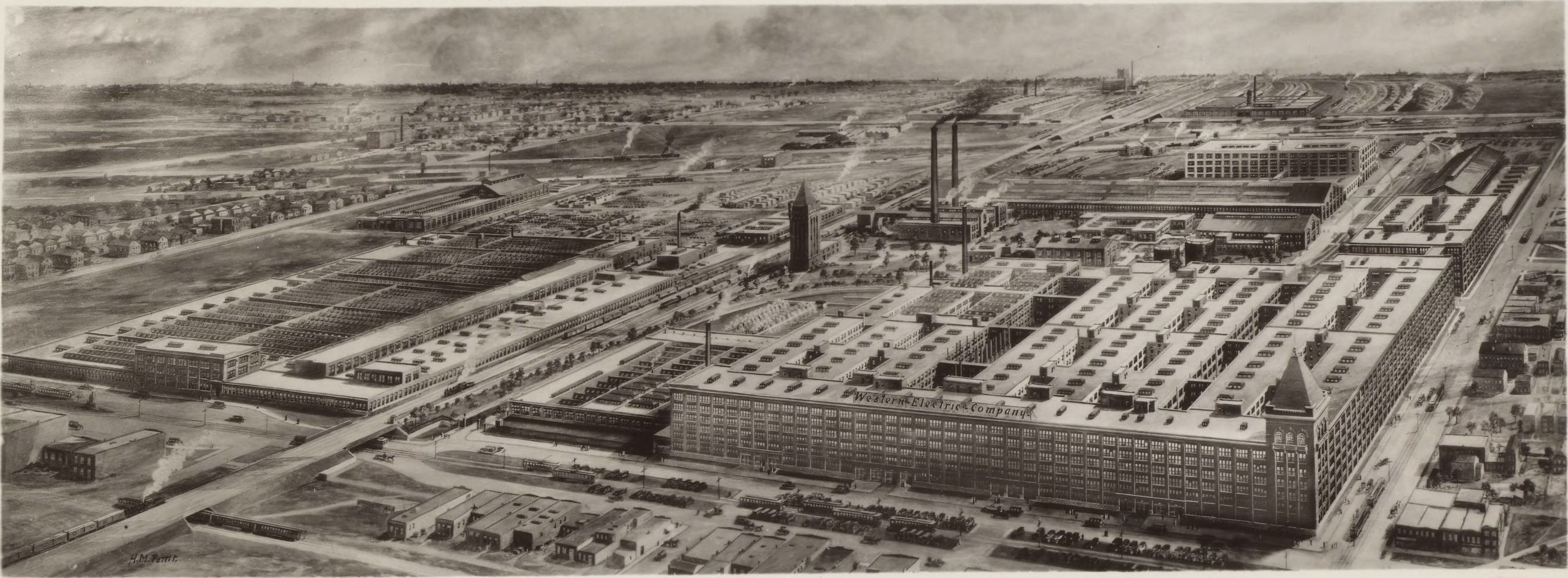
Aerial view of the Hawthorne Works, 1925.

Lyndall Urwick was the first person to take public notice of the successive studies of human relations in industry undertaken by the Western Electric Company. He was at the time Director of the International Institute of Management at Geneva; and somewhere in the early 1930s he published a monograph on the Hawthorne experiments. At that time the enquiry was still in being and no books dealing officially with the tortuous course of the study had then been published.

This has since been altered; approximately seven books, including the official Management and the Worker by Roethlisberger and Dickson and The Industrial Worker by North Whitehead, have appeared and have circulated widely in the United States and even beyond the American borders. Unfortunately these books, and other books that comment on them, are not easily obtainable at the moment outside the United States. This is of course due to the 'dollar shortage' and other disturbances of social and economic balance that have followed the latest European war. So that, at a moment when everyone needs to know more of the Western Electric findings, anything that approximates to a careful record is practically unobtainable.

And it is at this moment that Urwick, with the effective aid of his close associate Brech, has again come to the rescue. It is, I feel, timely and appropriate that one who first noticed the interest of the Hawthorne study should again undertake to make available to that section of the British public who desire to be further informed something of its details and probable significance. Such information is necessary; both the claims made for, and some criticisms of, the Western Electric experiments are often based upon extensive misunderstanding. I hope that the book will be read widely by the many who are, in these days of difficulty, vitally interested in the human problems of modern industry.

=== British Management Writings Before the First World War, 2003 ===
In his "British Management Writings Before the First World War" Brech (2003) summarised the raise of British approaches to management as follows:

In the two decades prior to World War I, a number of British writers and consultants had begun to address the problems of management in the modern world. Although they were aware of similar developments in America, where scientific management was becoming the latest business fashion, these writers sought to develop distinctly British approaches to management. Writers such as the engineers Joseph Slater Lewis, A.J. Liversedge and F.G. Burton, the consultants Edward Elbourne and J.W. Stannard, and the accountant Lawrence Dicksee laid stress on the need for a methodical approach to business management, the need to be inclusive and to motivate workers to see the company's goals as their own, and above all the need for more and better training for would-be managers... [Their work shows] the directions in which British management thinking might have gone had not World War I and the subsequent "Americanization" of British industry intervened. Today, they remain an important example of an alternative way of thinking about and practising management, and demonstrate the plurality and diversity of management thought...

== Selected publications ==
- Urwick, Lyndall Fownes, and Edward Franz Leopold Brech. The making of scientific management. Vol. 2.; Vol 3. Management publications trust, 1940–45.
- Edward Franz Leopold Brech. The Nature and Significance of Management. 1946.
- Brech, Edward Franz Leopold, and Andrew Beaumont Robertson (eds.). The Effective Business. The Effective Executive. British Institute of Management, 1964.
- Brech, Edward Franz Leopold. Management: its nature and significance. Pitman, 1969.
- Brech, Edward Franz Leopold, and E. F. L. Brech. The principles and practice of management. Addison-Wesley Longman Ltd, 1975.
- Brech, Edward Franz Leopold, The concept and gestation of Britain's central management institute, 1902–1976. Thoemmes, 2002.
- Brech, Edward Franz Leopold, The Evolution of Modern Management in Britain 1832–1979, 2002.
- Edward Brech, Andrew Thomson, and John F. Wilson. Lyndall Urwick, Management Pioneer: A Biography, 2010.
