= Andrew Thomson (academic) =

British academic and historian (1936–2014)

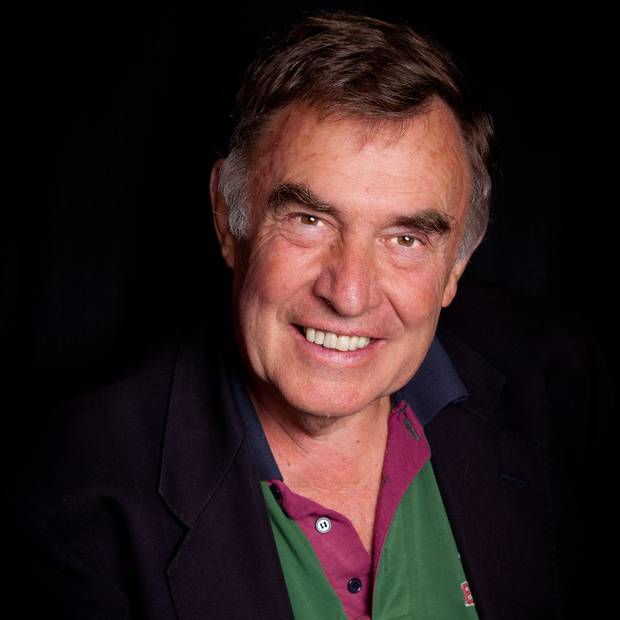
- Andrew Thomson, May 2011
- Born: Andrew William John Thomson; 26 January 1936; Stockton, County Durham, England
- Died: 26 December 2014 (aged 78); Paihia, New Zealand
- Occupation: Academic
- Children: 2

Professor Andrew William John Thomson, OBE, FBAM (26 January 1936 – 26 December 2014) was a British academic and historian who specialized in management education and industrial relations.

== Early life and education ==
Thomson was born in Stockton, and educated at St. Bees School in Cumberland. After his national service in the Army, he obtained a BA in Philosophy, Politics and Economics in 1959 from St Edmund Hall, Oxford University, and then a MS in Industrial Relations in 1961 from Cornell University, where he obtained a MS in Industrial Relations in 1961. He then returned to Britain to work as a brand manager for Lever Brothers between 1961 and 1965. In 1965, he returned to Cornell to do a PhD, which he obtained in 1968 with a thesis "The reaction of the American Federation of Labor and the Trades Union Congress to labor law, 1900-1935"

== Academic career ==
In 1968 he joined the Department of Social and Economic Research in the University of Glasgow, as lecturer, rising through the ranks to Professor of Business Policy in the recently formed Department of Management Studies in 1978. He held the posts of vice-chairman of the Industry and Employment Committee of the Economic and Social Research Council from 1983 to 1985 and Chairman of the Joint Committee of the ESRC and the Science and Engineering Research Council. He was also Dean of the Scottish Business School, a joint activity of the Glasgow, Edinburgh and Strathclyde Universities, from 1983 until 1987. He was chairman from 1985 to 1987 of the Council of University Management School. He was also a founder member of the British Academy of Management in 1987, and then its second chairman from 1990 to 1993. In a non-academic capacity, he was a director of the Scottish Transport Group from 1977 until 1984 and a member of the Scottish Agricultural Wages Board from 1985 until 1999.

In 1988, he was appointed as the first Dean of the School of Management at The Open University on the School’s establishment as a separate faculty in the university. He stood down from the deanship in 1993, remaining as a Professor in the School until his retirement in 2001. In 1981 he was appointed an OBE in 1993 for services to education. He was awarded an emeritus professorship by the Open University in 2006.

He was actively engaged in research during his career and his publications, with a range of co-authors, include: The Nationalised Transport Industries (1973); The Industrial Relations Act (1975); Grievance Procedures (1976); Collective Bargaining in the Public Sector (1978); A Portrait of Pay (1990); and Changing Patterns of Management Development (2001). When the Management History Research Group was formed in 1994 at the initiative of Edward Brech, he became its secretary until his retirement in 2001, but still continued his writing and wrote (with John Wilson) The Making of Modern Management: British Management in Historical Perspective (2006) and Lyndall Urwick: Management Pioneer (2010, with Brech and Wilson).

== Retirement and death ==
After his retirement he moved to New Zealand, where was involved with a number of institutions, including the Rotary Club of Bay of Islands, where he served as president in 2006-2007, and Focus Paihia, the community organization representing the town where he lived. He died on Boxing Day, 2014, from a blood clot in his lungs.
