= James A. Lyons =

James A. Lyons may refer to:

- James Lyons (admiral) (1927–2018), admiral in the United States Navy
- James Alexander Lyons (1861–1920), American accountancy author
