= J. Slater Lewis =

British engineer, inventor, business manager and author

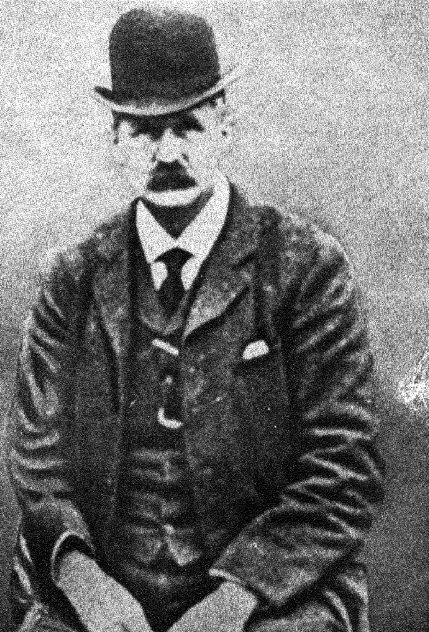
J. Slater Lewis, late 19th century.

Joseph Slater Lewis MICE FRSE (4 June 1852 – 27 July 1901) was a British engineer, inventor, business manager, and early author on management and accounting, known for his pioneering work on cost accounting.

== Biography ==
Lewis's early life was spent largely in Helsby, Cheshire at the Rake House, where he was born. After attending a private school at Nantwich, he received further education at the Mechanics' Institutes in Manchester. Lewis was apprentice at a land agent and surveyor, named George Slater, in Northwich from 1868 to 1872. In his younger years he had been particularly interested in agriculture and had been secretary to the Wirral and Birkenhead Agricultural Society. In the 1870s he was working as a coal trader in Malpas, and turned his attention to mechanical engineering and electricity.

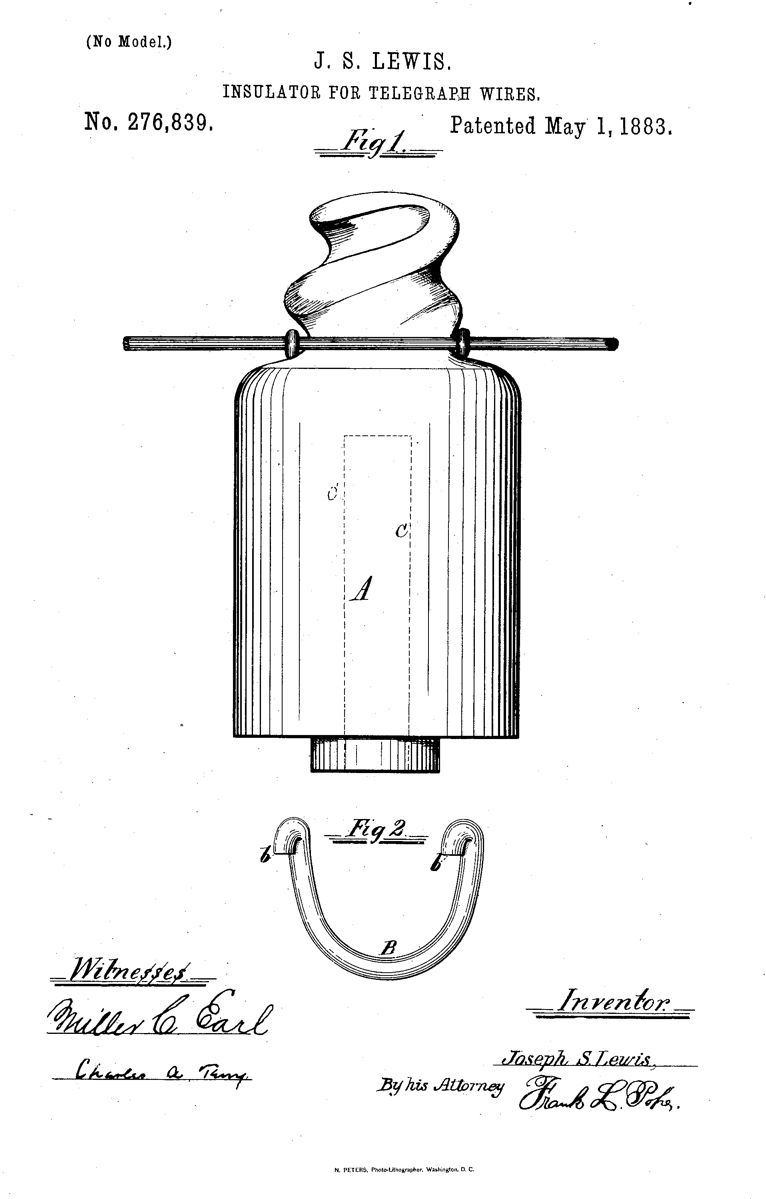
Patent drawing of Slater Lewis' Insulator for Telegraph Wires, 1883

In 1879 in Helsby Lewis started his own company in electrical engineering. The next year he invented and patented a self-binding insulator for electric telegraph wire, which he started to manufacture. This device got adopted across Europe and in the United States. After he had travelled to the United States to sell his American rights, he extended his company's work into other branches of electrical engineering, then merged with a neighbouring company to form the Telegraph Manufacturing Co., Limited, where for some years he was managing director.

In 1892 Lewis became manager of the electrical engineering company W.T. Goolden & Co. in London, which specialised in mining machinery. After two years, in 1894, he joined the rolling mills company P. R. Jackson & Co., to start up an electrical engineering department, eventually becoming general manager of the entire company. In 1900 he became director of the Brush Electrical Engineering Company, where Emile Garcke had been managing director since 1891. In the summer of 1901 he died suddenly from an attack of apoplexy.

Lewis was a member of the Institution of Civil Engineers, the Institution of Mechanical Engineers and the Institution of Electrical Engineers. He was elected Fellow of the Royal Society of Edinburgh, and in 1898 elected a member of the Iron and Steel Institute.

== Work ==
At the start of the Second Industrial Revolution, books on the operation of business institutions were quite rare. Midway through the 19th century American railroad executives Henry Varnum Poor and Daniel McCallum had published some ideas about a modern system of management, but their impact was limited. However, in the 1880s, societies of civil and mechanical engineers in the United States and in Britain stimulated a stream of publications.

J. Slater Lewis' Commercial Organization of Factories (1896) was one of the seminal works in Britain, along with works such as Garcke, Fells' Factory accounts, their principles and practice (1887/89), and Francis G. Burton's Commercial Management of Engineering Works (1899). and others. Those works contributed significantly to the establishment the new discipline of cost accounting.

=== Commercial Organization of Factories, 1896. ===
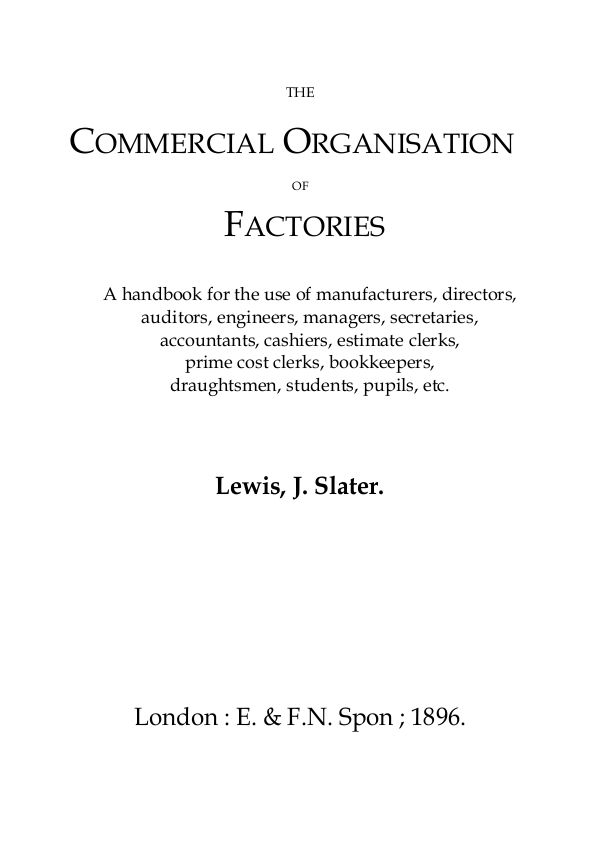
Title page, 1896.

In 1896 J. Slater Lewis published his "Commercial Organization of Factories." Hugo Diemer (1904) listed this work as one of the seminal works in the field of work management, which evolved into Industrial engineering. In his "Bibliography of Works Management" Diemer summarised the essence of this work:

Mr. Lewis's comprehensive work of 540 pages deals with administration, organization, and accounting. The fact that a specific system is traced through the work, with elaboration of its minutest details, makes the work one that requires the closest sort of application and study in order that one may get from it the principles generally applicable. Much attention is devoted to strictly commercial office-accounting.
To Mr. Lewis belongs the credit of making a very full exposition of the important subject of the proper distribution of establishment charges, as he calls them, or expense accounts as generally designated in America. Chapter XXIII of the work devotes seventeen pages to a thorough treatment of this subject, which is carried out even more fully in Chapter XXXIV, on "Works and Job Office," in which the "Standing Order" system is also explained.
Mr. Lewis makes use of the chart method of circles and arrows as previously employed by Garcke and Fells, in illustrating the connection between the accounts and forms illustrated. He also carries the chart system a step further, to illustrate the staff organization of the factory.

McKay (2011) suggested, that this work "might be the first manufacturing management text. Lewis provides a very thorough discussion and mapping of a factory's decision making and information flow, details the cost accounting, and describes how manufacturing was orchestrated from order taking to shipping.'"

==== Aim and purpose ====
In the Preface of the work, Slater Lewis (1896) explained about the aim and purpose of this volume:

Notwithstanding the progress of the age, every manufacturer still devises his own system of accounts, has his own books and forms specially drafted and printed and his clerks educated in methods which may be of little or no value to them in other factories. There is, in fact, no recognised system for the student to learn, and none for the schools to teach : nor are there any examinations through which managers, time cost clerks and others may receive certificates for proficiency in one universally accepted system.
Engineering, save in the matter of factory accounts, is endowed with acknowledged formulae, rules, tables, and data of every description, the acquisition of a knowledge of which the State has deemed to be of national importance, and technical schools and other State-aided institutions have come to stay; but whether the legislature will ever recognise the exact relationship between successful engineering and scientific book-keeping, and afford the rising generation opportunities of qualifying themselves for positions where both are indispensable conditions, remains to be seen. It is beyond question, however, that the largest and most successful industrial undertakings are those where minuteness of detail and perfection of organisation have received paramount consideration : a fact which should, in itself, especially in these days of world-wide competition, make the commercial organisation of factories a matter of the first importance in every country with any manufacturing pretensions.

In the opening of the first introductory chapter, Slater Lewis further explained:

This book is intended as a practical handbook for the use of manufacturers who wish to adopt modern methods of organisation. It is written throughout from the point of view of an organiser and manager, rather than from that of a professional accountant, and the author hopes that this feature will commend it to those who have to bear the responsibility of conducting large engineering and manufacturing undertakings.

And furthermore:

The author is satisfied that it is almost as difficult to persuade those who have the responsibility of conducting large industrial undertakings that a complete and intelligent office organisation will save money, time and worry, as it was a few years ago to convince them that the use of modern machine tools was indispensable to good workmanship with cheap production. Now, however, that it has been established by experience that special machinery for each manufacturing operation, the consequent division of labour in the works, is the only economical method of production, it may be clear that the same principle should be applied to the division of labour in the office, by reducing the clerical work to pure routine. To expect this to be carried out with old-fashioned books and foolscap paper would be equivalent to expecting the production of a high-class engine by old-fashioned appliances at the same price and within the same time as one turned out by the aid of the latest labour-saving machinery...

==== Duties of the manager ====
On the duties of the manager, particularly general management, Slater Lewis (1896) presented an exacting and constructive view:

The duties of the manager are of a most responsible nature, and special stress should be laid on the importance the paramount importance of his being a strict disciplinarian. He must be a practical man of the world, a good organiser, and, above all, must possess tact and judgment. He should be known as a man who means what he says, and who conveys the impression to one and all that he means to be obeyed. As regards the technical details of the business, he should be a thoroughly practical all-round man. He need not necessarily have an intimate acquaintance with the mathematical or other minutiae of each branch of the business, but must have a strong capacity for administrative work. He should have an instinctive knowledge of what his customers really require, and know the smartest and cheapest way of supplying their wants. He should be <]uite at home in modern office routine, in accounts kept by double entry, in the handling of large bodies of men, and in the application of modern machinery to all classes of engineering work. It will generally be found that those only can fill this position successfully who make completeness of work their chief and absorbing aim. The manager should bear the reputation of being firm, and at the same time absolutely impartial to everybody under his charge, from his office boy upwards. He should always be ready to learn from anyone, and, in whatever work he may have in hand, should adopt the latest processes and methods, and carry them out in the most efficient manner. If he has to erect a new factory, he should think out every detail before he commences operations, and not wait for developments during the progress of the work. If he has no experience of his own to guide him, he should promptly seek the advice of those who have.

==== Job and works order ====
One special feature of Lewis's book was a clearer specification of the term "job", distinguishing the job and the works order. Church (1908) explained, this distinction made by Slater Lewis:

The works order may, and usually does, consist of a considerable number of distinct jobs. Practically the job may be defined as the amount of time spent by any particular workman on any particular piece or similar set of pieces. Thus, a works order for a lathe will include such jobs as planning bed, cutting leading screw, milling slide rest, etc. If the works order were for six lathes of similar pattern, the jobs would be extended similarly – as, for instance, planning six beds, cutting six leading screws, etc. In the case of work done otherwise than on customer's stock orders, the job would be for items such as new screw for No. 45 lathe, altering position of band saw No. 67, etc. It will be evident that some jobs will be charged with material and some not...

==== Basis for labour costing ====
In chapter XI on "Estimating" Slater Lewis (1896) presents a notable basis for labour costing.

Each manufacturing operation, or each set of operations, should, when an estimate is being prepared, be carefully dissected and entered on foolscap paper, or in a rough estimate book. Each operation should have a reference number, which should appear upon the drawing and in the book in which the estimate is being prepared. When this information has been so extracted and checked, so that nothing may be overlooked, the prices should be added to each item. These prices should be arrived at by the manager, the estimate clerk and the foreman conjointly. Each one should write down privately his price or rate for each operation, immediately after which they should be compared and a definite figure arrived at : a very safe method being that of adopting the mean of the three rates.

==== Diagram of manufacturing accounts ====
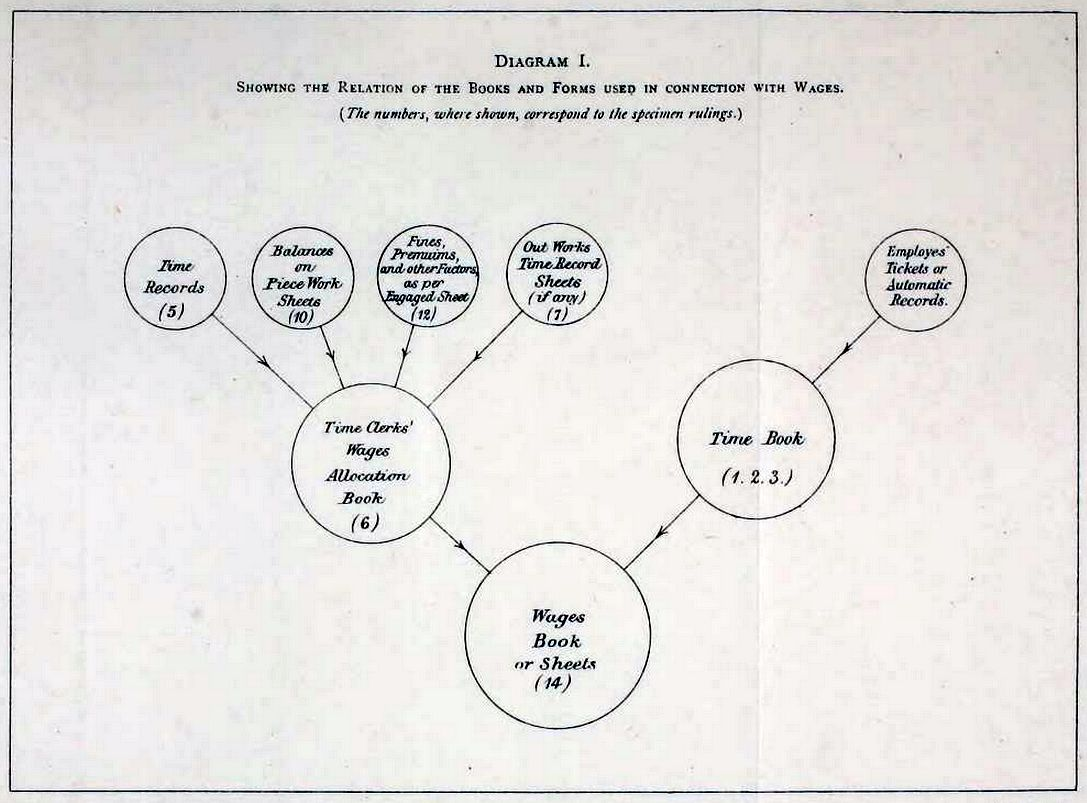
Scheme how to incorporate the labour costs into the factory accounts by Garcke and Fells (1887/89).

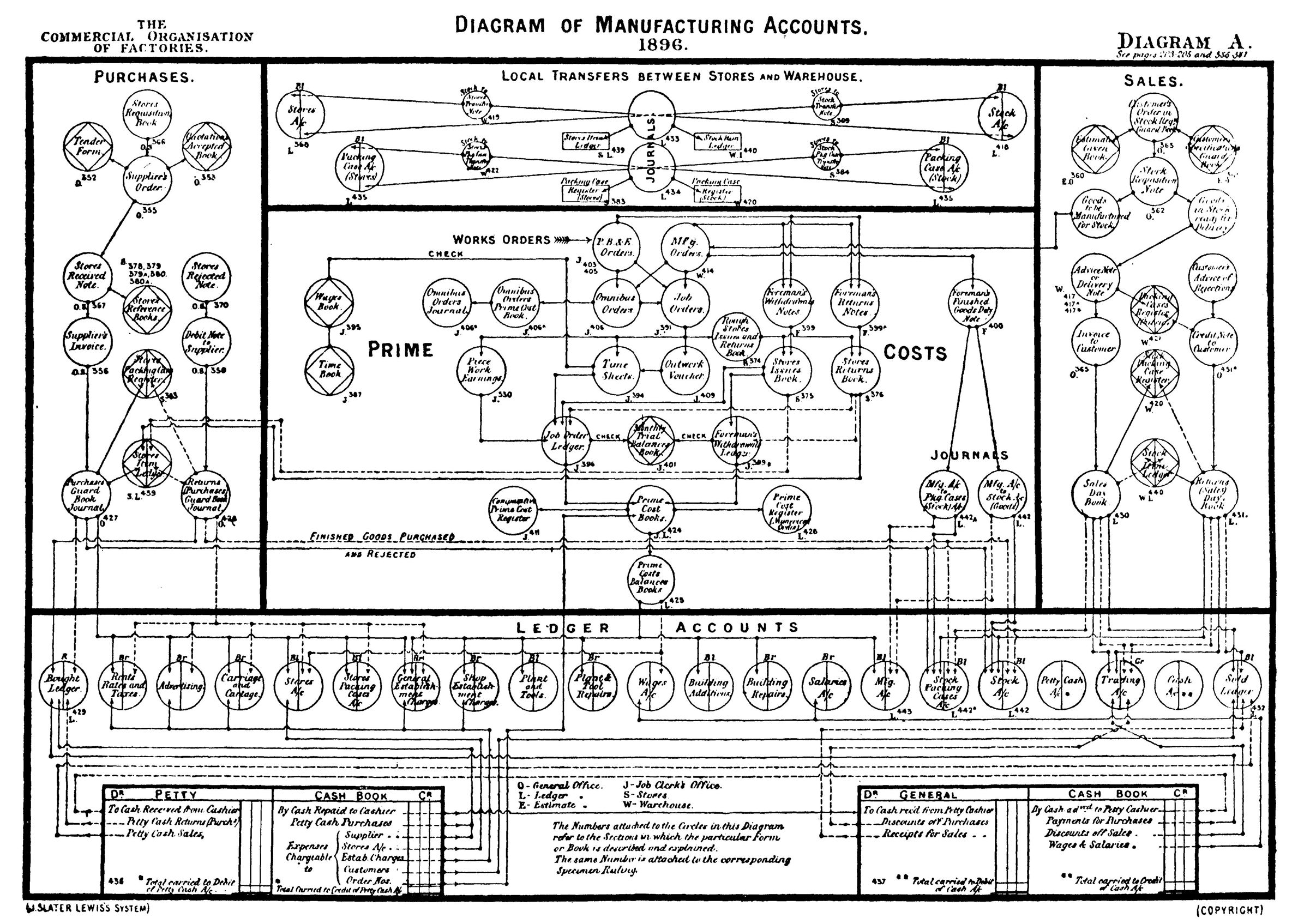
Diagram of Manufacturing Accounts, J.S. Lewis 1896.

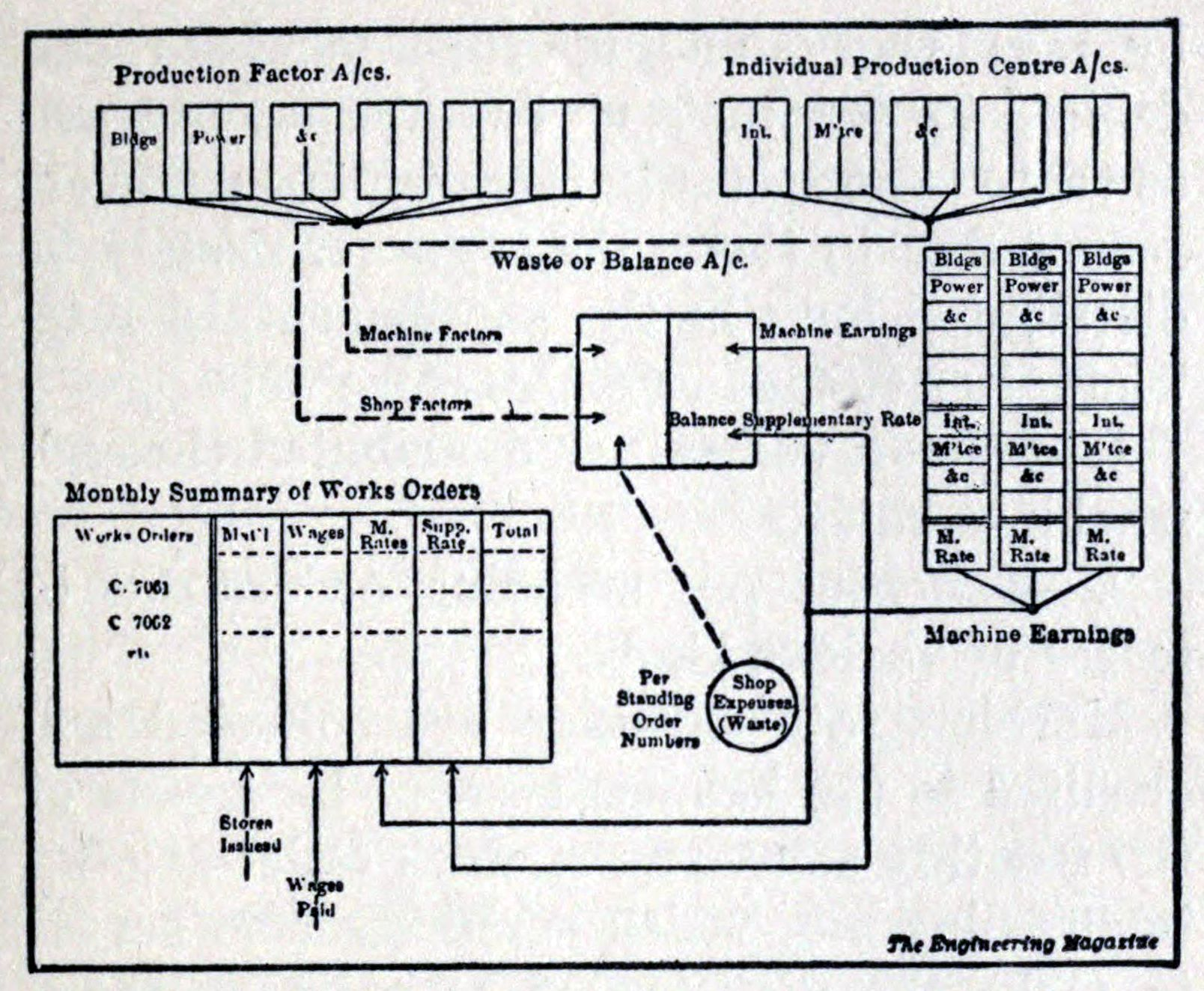
Systems of Controlling Accounts, Church 1910.

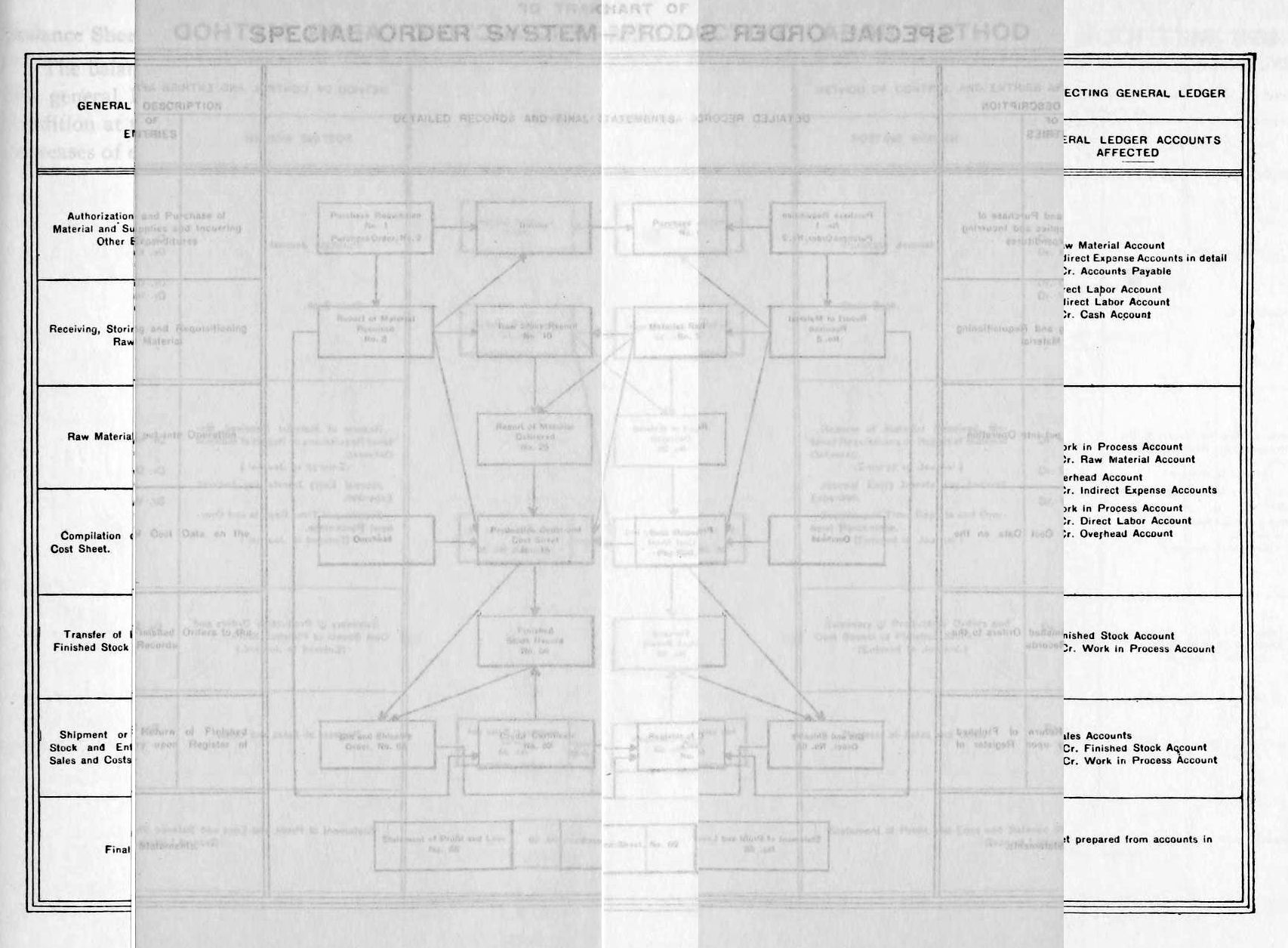
Special order system (fragments). Nicholson. 1913.

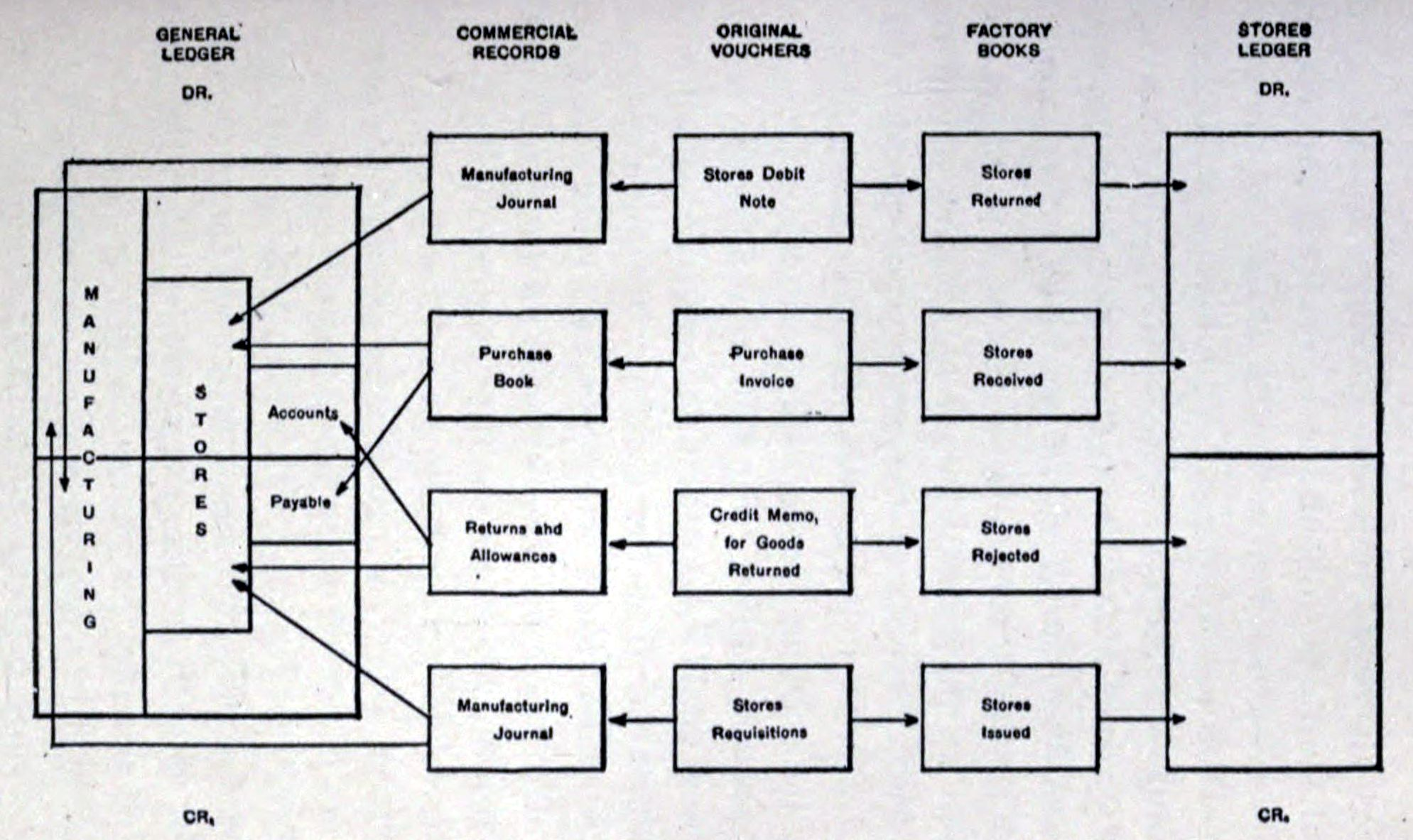
Relation of Stores Records to Commercial Records, Moxey 1913/19.

Slater Lewis' paid special attention to the establishment charges, or overhead element, of manufacturing costs, and advocated the integrating of costs into financial accounts. Garcke and Fells (1887/89) had made a first step here proposing a system to incorporate material costs and labour costs into the double-entry bookkeeping system. Slater Lewis focussed on the next step, and developed a method to practically use the ledger accounts to distributing overhead to work in process. In the years to come, this would become standard in engineering factories. In chapter XXIII on "Establishment Charges" Slater Lewis explained its principles in the paragraph on "Allocation of Establishment Expenditure." He opens:

For the mere purposes of commercial book-keeping, it matters, indeed, little in which way the general and shop establishment charges are dealt with, so long as they are eventually paid for out of the profits made on the work, that is to say, it matters little whether they appear in the books as chargeable to general revenue, or are allocated to the several items of work in progress in the shops. But apart from mere book-keeping, and to meet the requirements of the management for estimating, for controlling the efficiency of production and for comparing, period by period, the relative economy and efficiency of shop administration, it is absolutely necessary to keep the accounts of prime cost (meaning thereby the actual expenditure in labour and material directly incurred in the production of manufactured goods) entirely separate from the establishment charges (shop and general), so that the naked truth as to the cost of the operations which have taken place in the shops shall plainly appear on the face of the accounts. The comparison of the costs of machines produced at intervals even of years is thus rendered possible.

In a diagram of manufacturing accounts, Slater Lewis explained how "scheme of production and cost control is unfolded in its logical flow." This diagram was based on the scheme, that pictured how to incorporate labour costs into the factory accounts, presented by Garcke and Fells in 1887/89 (see above). Urwick & Brech (1946) more specifically explained:

As the scheme of production and cost control is unfolded in its logical flow, following the sequence that the customer's enquiry will take as it is transformed into an order, a job ticket, a material requisition, and so on, it eventually reaches the general accountancy phase and opens up the processes of book-keeping.
To deal with these in the simplest manner, Slater Lewis added an illustrative appendix of nearly thirty pages, containing transactions set out in specimen sheet form. And it is perhaps in this connection that the significance of his scheme is most clearly revealed. For the whole system is an interlocking unity. So closely related are the various procedures and documents that he is able to portray them all in a single "flow chart," undoubtedly the first of its kind in British industry. Two remarkable diagrams are presented to show this feature and to make their continuous study easier. They are supplied as folded sheets slipped into the back cover of the book. How precisely and clearly they illustrate his teaching, Lewis indicates himself by a note in heavy type offering on application unfolded copies of the diagrams for framing and display.

As Diemer (1904) explained in the Diagram of Manufacturing Accounts, Slater Lewis made "use of the chart method of circles and arrows as previously employed by Garcke and Fells, in illustrating the connection between the accounts and forms illustrated."

A decennium earlier Garcke and Fells had developed a System of factory accounting, and pictured its elements in four complementary flow diagrams (only the first of four diagrams is pictured here). In Slater Lewis' Diagram of Manufacturing Accounts these four diagrams are integrated to picture the system of manufacturing accounts as one whole. A decennium later Alexander Hamilton Church (1908/10) would further develop this system by introducing the concept of production factors, and picturing the "Principles of Organization by Production Factors" (see image) around any organisation. Using this concept of production factors Church was able to simplify the system of manufacturing accounts to a "Systems of Controlling Accounts" (see image).

Nicholson & Rohrbach (1913) in their Cost accounting differentiated this one method into four different:

1. Special Order System, Productive Labor Method (see image, which only shows some fragments)
2. Special Order System, Process or Machine Method
3. Product System, Productive Labor Method, and
4. Product System, Process or Machine Method.

In the same year Nicholson & Rohrbach published their work, in 1913/19, Edward P. Moxey published his influential textbook on accountancy, in which he also pictured the relation of stores records to commercial records (see image).

In his 1960 Accounting principles Braden and Allyn described and pictured the cost-flow principle:

As direct material passes from the storeroom into the factory for conversion into finished products and back into the storeroom for storage until sold, costs are being gathered in totals and per unit for each stage of the productive process. Each movement in the factory operation is accounted for at the time it occurs. This is the cost-flow principle. Assisting in the carrying out of this principle is the perpetual inventory method of accounting for inventories. In the operation of this method of handling inventory, a record is made of the issue of direct and indirect materials from the storeroom, as well as a record of their receipt when they are purchased. The continuous accounting for the flow of materials at the time of occurrence is essential to an accounting for costs.

In an accompanying diagram they illustrates "the flow of the three sources of cost through the factory (work in process), into the storeroom (finished goods), and into the hands of the customers (cost of sales), as they appear in these general ledger control accounts." They further explained that "the flow of the product through the plant and the corresponding flow of costs through the accounts basically follows one of two different systems. One system is called the job order system; the other system is the process cost system."

==== Shop charges and general establishment charges ====
A key element in the proper distribution of establishment charges is the distinction made between shop charges and general establishment charges or works cost and inclusive cost. Church (1908) further explained the details:

... the necessity for and the justice of this distinction between shop charges and general charges (works cost and inclusive cost) hardly needs insistence. It has been ably and exhaustively argued in the work of Mr. Slater Lewis, already referred to, but the argument may be briefly recapitulated here.
Nothing is naturally more distinct than the operations of making and selling. They require different instincts and widely separate talents. An undertaking may be most efficiently organized and managed on one of these sides, and yet be unsuccessful, because what is gained in one set of efforts is lost in another. What is more useful, therefore, than to make this natural division of work to be reflected by a similar division in the system of accounting? It is the easiest and simplest of all the modifications with which we shaU meet, because it is the most obvious and fundamental...

Church (1908) concluded that:

Mr. Slater Lewis's theory on this point is very clear and distinct, and should be studied by every manufacturer who cares for accuracy and clearness in place of confusion and mixed results in his accounts. It is not too much to say that any system of accounts which lumps both classes of charge together and averages them all round is entirely worthless. Far from being an improvement on a simple system of prime cost, it is probable that it may easily, by inducing a false security, be positively dangerous and worse than no system at all.

More contemporarily, Chatfield (2014) summarised the innovation as follows:

[The] preferred treatment of overhead costs was to bring them into contact with prime costs only at the end of an accounting period. Lewis proposed, that accounts containing overhead items be closed to profit and loss like ordinary expenses. At the same time, work in process and finished goods would be debited with their respective shares of overhead cost, and a suspense account in the general ledger would be credited. At the start of the next period a reversing entry was to be made, debiting suspense and crediting profit and loss. Then suspense was again debited and finished goods and work in process were credited, bringing the inventory accounts back to a prime cost basis and leaving total overhead cost as a balance in suspense.

==== Staff Organisation Diagram ====
Diemer (1908) credited Slater Lewis for introducing a chart system to illustrate the staff organisation of the factory. His work expressed a "surprisingly modern in its attitude towards organisation structure." Slater Lewis (1896) stated:

The question of staff precedence is also one which deserves more attention than it usually receives, and is very often a fertile source of jealousy and heart-burning amongst employees. In no circumstances should any members of the staff be placed in positions antagonistic to one another, or given dual and overlapping control of one or more departments. It would be just as imprudent as allowing two commanders to dispute for mastery on the same ship, or as having no degree of rank amongst the officers, or any dividing line between the duties of the steward and those of the carpenter. It is imperative that every member of the staff should have a clearly defined position, and be given to understand in unmistakable terms to whom he has to look for orders, otherwise continual bickering and consequent dis-organisation will inevitably occur. It should also be intimated to every official, particularly in the minor positions of responsibility, that they must exercise self-control and not ride roughshod over those who may happen to be their subordinates.

In the last chapter of his work Salter Lewis presented a short paragraph about the "Diagram of Staff Organisation," which read:

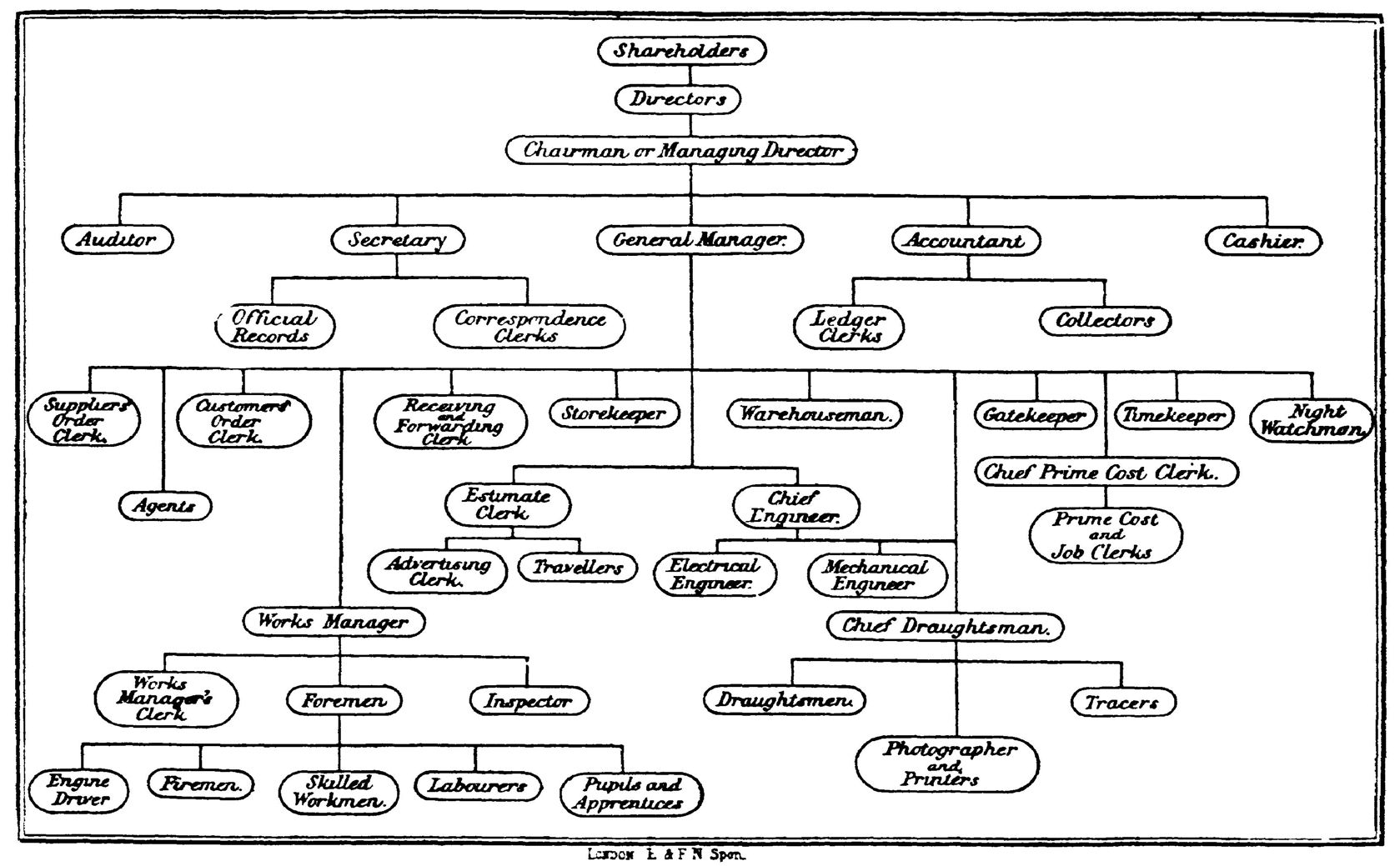
Staff Organisation Diagram, J.S. Lewis 1896.

Some officials being disposed, not infrequently, to regard themselves as equal, if not superior to men who are really their masters, it is essential to the well-being of all industrial concerns to have a definite organisation under which responsibility may not only be fixed, but the relative positions or rank of the officials clearly defined. For this purpose it is necessary to have recourse to a diagram such as the Specimen (see image)...
The diagram should be carefully drawn in bold lines and clear letters on a sheet of drawing paper not less than 'double elephant' size. It should then be framed and placed in a conspicuous position in the general offices...
The diagram can of course be varied to suit particular organisations, though, as it stands, it is as nearly as possible in accordance with the general practice prevailing in this country...

Urwick & Brech (1946) noted that to their knowledge, this is "the first example of a modern organisation chart in British business literature." They concluded that "the fact that in a treatise so intimately concerned with every aspect of management, organisation structure is touched on so incidentally as regards method indicates how little the need for definition of formalised relations in an industrial enterprise had been appreciated by the end of the nineteenth century."

== Reception ==
In his days Lewis was recognised both as inventor and pioneer of management and accounting. The "Journal of the Iron and Steel Institute" (1901) wrote in his obituary:

Lewis was the inventor of several electrical devices, but he is perhaps best known as the author of the standard book on "The Commercial Organisation of Factories," (1895) the pioneer work of its kind. This brought him into correspondence with progressive firms all over the world. Regarding the problems of business organisation as a connected whole, and looking on them from the point of view of a manager, he worked out a complete system of accounting, organisation, and contract, which must remain for many years to come a standard by which later developments will be judged...

And furthermore:

... He was a keen student of the social and economic conditions of commercial life, and his broad views, often strikingly original and forcibly expressed, together with his exceptional administrative abilities and personal force and influence, made him a prominent figure in engineering circles, and he enjoyed to the full the confidence and respect of those whose good fortune it was to be associated with him.

According to Millerson (1964) J. Slater Lewis's work was one of the pillars in establishing the field of production engineering in the 1920s. He explained:

During the 1914–18 war, accelerated expansion of production methods caused a new branch of engineering to emerge — production engineering. This was based on the theory and techniques contributed by the work of F. B. Gilbreth and F. W. Taylor in the U.S.A., J. Slater Lewis and A. J. Liversedge in England, and Henri Fayol in France. At the end of 1920, H. E. Horner wrote to 'Engineering Production' proposing an organization for engineers specializing in manufacturing processes. Correspondence developed, interest led to a plan, and the 'Institution of Production Engineers' was inaugurated in February 1921...

Nowadays Lewis is still known for his pioneering work on cost accounting. He was "an early advocate of integrating cost and financial accounts, but his preferred treatment of overhead costs was to bring them into contact with prime costs only at the end of an accounting period."

== Selected publications ==
- Lewis, J. Slater. The Commercial Organization of Factories. Spon, 1896.
- Lewis, J. Slater. The Mechanical and Commercial Limits of Specialization. New York (1901).

Articles, a selection:

- Lewis, J. Slater. "Works management for the maximum of production." Engineering Magazine 18 (1899): 59–63.
