= James Alexander Lyons =

James Alexander Lyons (1861–1920) was an American accountancy author, and publisher, known for publishing a series of books on bookkeeping and accountancy in the early 20th century. The first work Lyons published was the 1896 textbook entitled A Treatise on Business Practice, which was designed as textbook for all business schools and as reference for all classes.

== Biography ==
Lyons had started his commercial textbook business in cooperation with Orville Marcellus Powers (1852–1910s) under the name Powers & Lyons in the 1890s. One of the first books were The New Business Arithmetic; A Treatise on Commercial Calculations, first published in 1893, and The Complete Accountant: Designed for the Use of Schools and Private Study : a book of reference for the counting house, embodying the latest forms and methods in use in the best business houses, first published in 1898. Both books were authored by Powers, and ran in several editions.

The firm Powers & Lyons had been dissolved in 1909, and Lyons assumes full ownership, continuing the business under the name of J. A. Lyons & Company. In 1911 James W. Carnahan joined the firm, who had been general representative of the Ginn & Company publishing company. The publishing company changed its name in Lyons and Carnahan. Based in Chicago, the company continued to concentrated on publishing textbooks.

== Work ==
=== Modern Corporation Accounting, 1908 ===
The purpose of the 1908 Modern Corporation Accounting, was to show students what a corporation is, and how it is created; to give them in concise form a correct idea of those accounts which belong peculiarly to corporation bookkeeping, and the original entries which affect those accounts; and to illustrate several processes of closing the ledger of a corporation and distributing corporation profits. While studying these things, observing students will learn much that will be of general benefit and that will serve to guide them in possible future dealings with corporations.

=== Bookkeeping: Classification of loss or gain accounts ===
In Modern Corporation Accounting, (1908) Lyons picture some of the transactions and entries which are peculiar to corporations and corporation accounting. In doing so, he presents one of the earliest modern flow diagrams of cost accounting. These relation was originally pictured by Emile Garcke and J. M. Fells in their System of factory accounting from 1889. Lyons had simplified these relations into one single flow diagram:

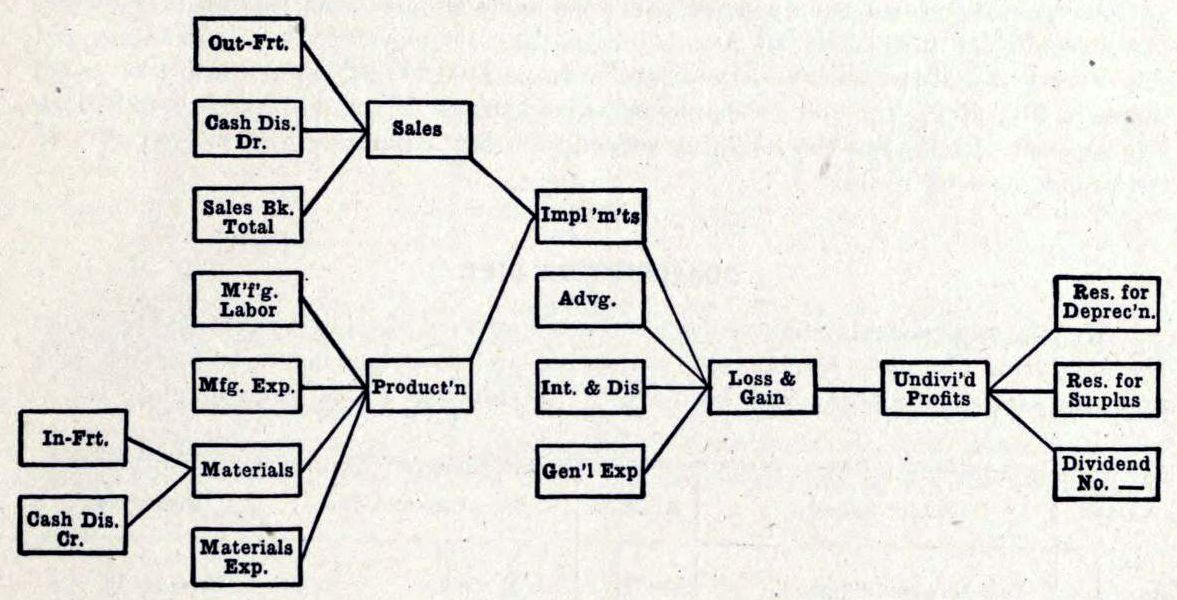
Relation of the various loss or gain accounts, 1908

Lyon explained that the above diagram shows the relation of the various loss or gain accounts to each other, and indicates what account each group of accounts closes into. Out-Freight, Cash Discount Dr., and the Sales Book total, close into the Sales account. Manufacturing Labor, Manufacturing Expense, Materials, and Materials Expense close into Production (after In-Freight and Cash Discount Cr., which are subordinate to Materials, have been closed into Materials). Sales and Production, which now exhibit respectively the net returns on merchandise and the gross cost of manufacture, are closed into Implements, which is the Merchandise account.

Loss & Gain accounts in various companies, 1909

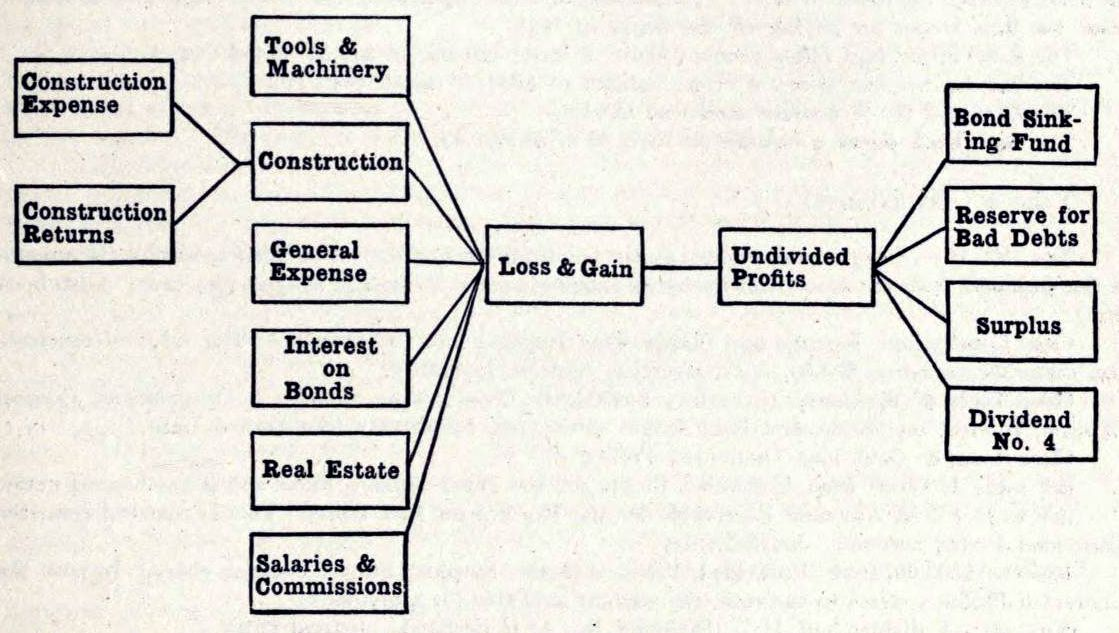
Northwestern Construction Company

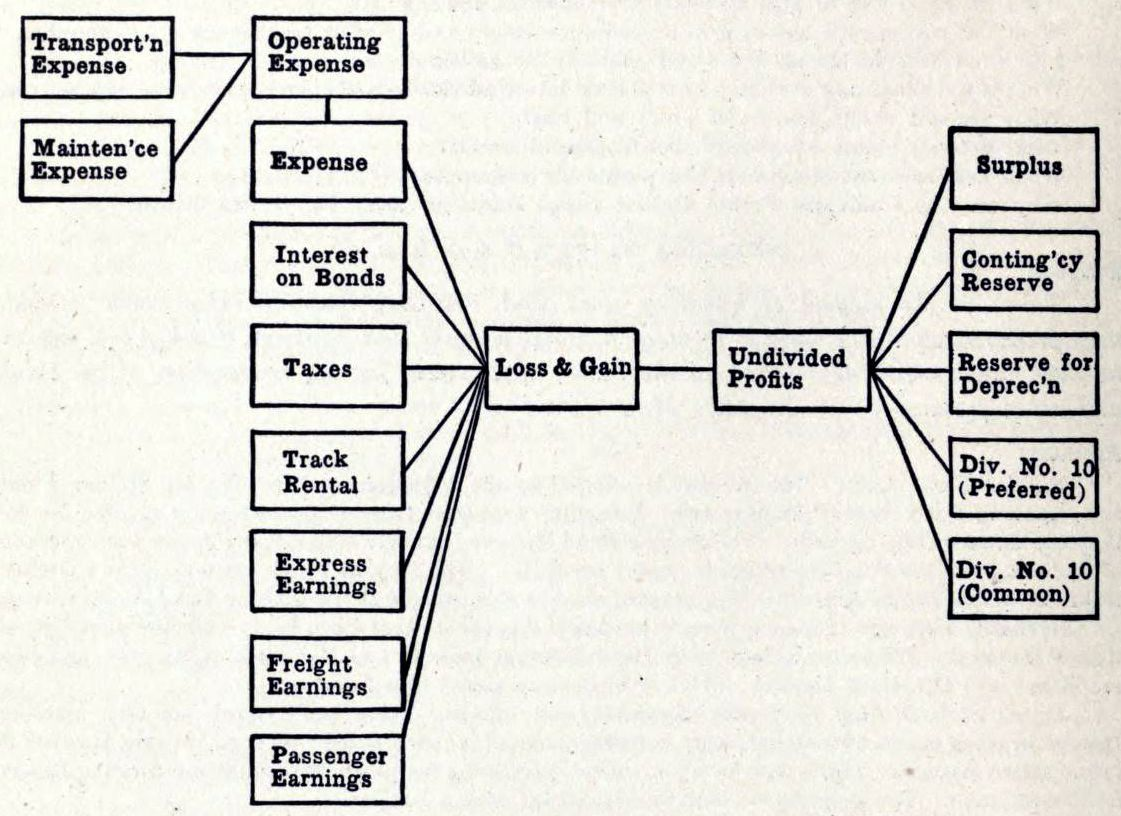
C. & G. Railroad

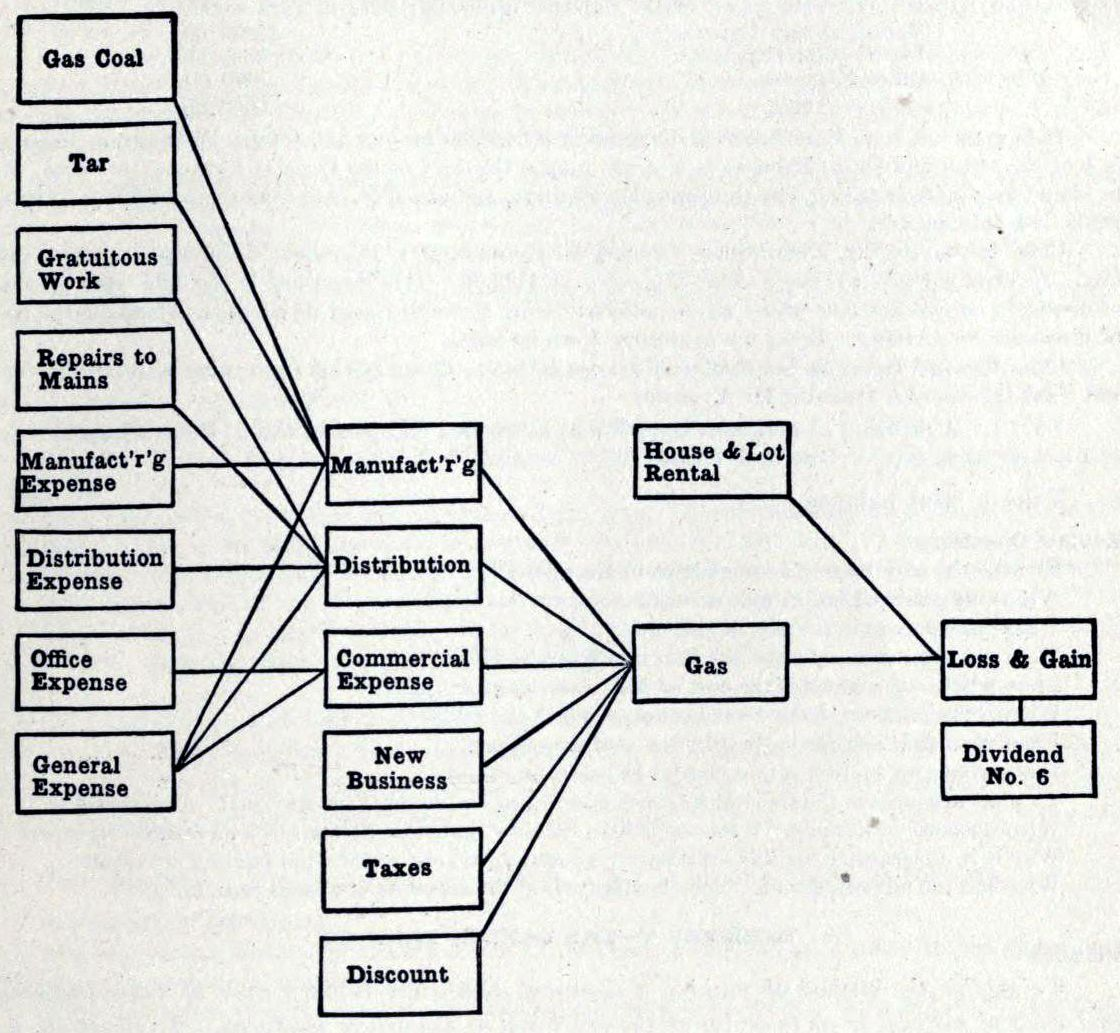
Syracuse Gas Co.

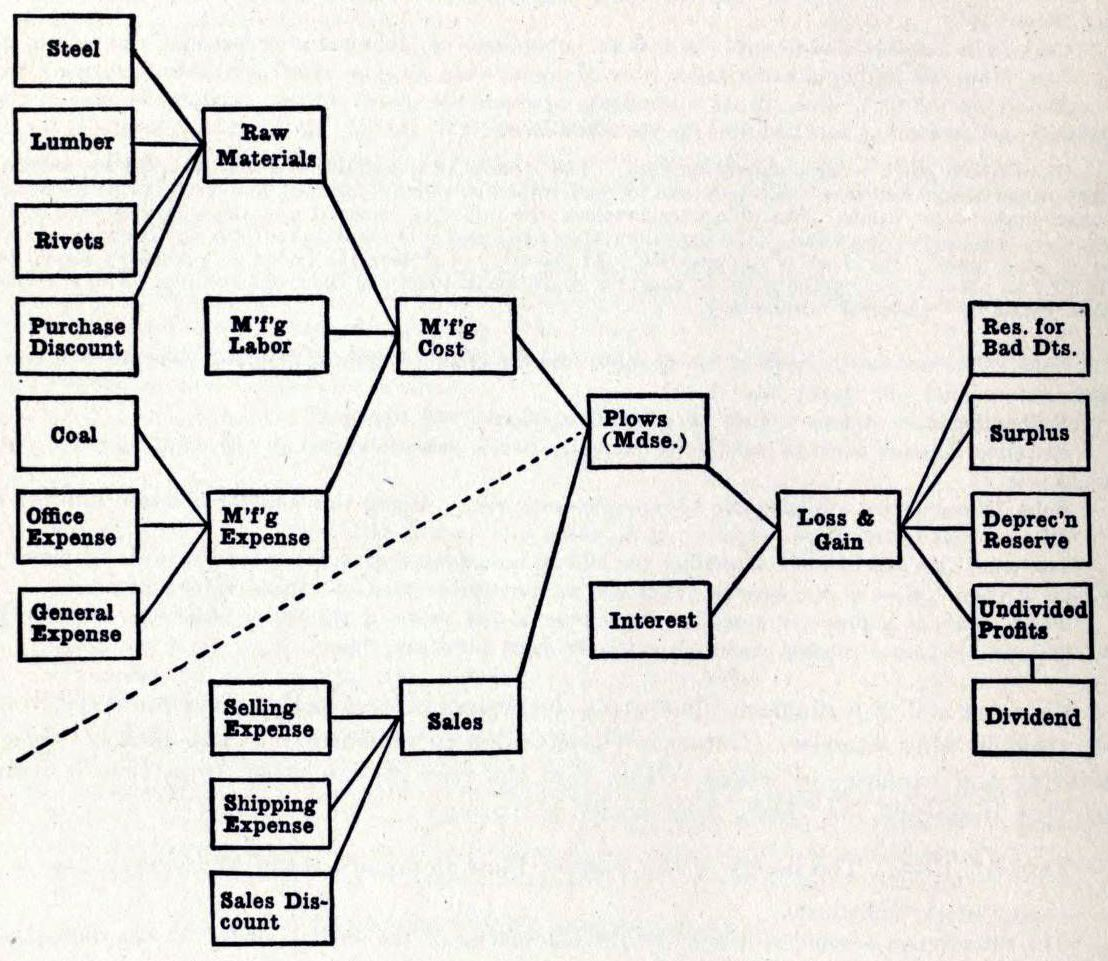
Canton Plow Company

In the exercise section of the book four other examples where pictured of Loss & Gain accounts for a construction company, a railroad company, a gas production company, and a plow company, see images above.

== Selected publications ==
- Lyons, James A. A treatise on business practice; or, How business is done designed as a text-book in all schools where any instruction for business life is given, and as a book of reference for all classes. Chicago, O.M. Lyons, 1896.
- Lyons, James A., The pedagogy of commercial branches; an address delivered by J.A. Lyons... Chicago, Powers & Lyons, 1902.
- Lyons, James Alexander. Wholesale Accounting: Being a Comprehensive, Scientific and Teachable Presentation of a Method of Bookkeeping, Adapted to Wholesaling in General, and to the Grocery Business in Particular. Powers & Lyons, 1905.
- Whigam, Wallace H., Lyons, James A. Modern accountant : designed for the use of schools and for private study. Chicago : Powers & Lyons, 1905; 1913.
- Lyons, James A., Modern corporation accounting (voucher system) including instruction in corporate organization methods of transacting business, and bookkeeping. J.A. Lyons & Co. in Chicago, New York, 1908.
- Lyons, James A., and Walter L. Read. Modern accountant: revised. JA Lyons & company, 1911.
- Lyons, James Alexander, and Walter L. Read. Lyons' Bookkeeping and accounting. Lyons & Carnahan, 1913.
- Kenneth F. Burgess and James A. Lyons. Burgess' commercial law; a text book or all classes of schools and colleges in which courses are offered in commercial law. Chicago, Lyons & Carnahan, 1921.
- Burgess, Kenneth Farwell, James Alexander Lyons, and John Henry Cox. The New Burgess' Commercial Law. Lyons & Carnahan, 1933.
