= Suspense account =

Account used to temporarily carry doubtful entries pending review

A suspense account is an account used temporarily to carry doubtful entries and discrepancies pending their analysis and permanent classification.

It can be a repository for monetary transactions (cash receipts, cash disbursements and journal entries) entered with invalid account numbers. The account specified may not exist, or it may be deleted/frozen. If one of these conditions applies, the transaction should be directed to a suspense account.

In branchless banking (BB) - banking through mobile for the unbanked - these accounts are used for 'money-in-transit'. For example, sender sends payment from US ACH account to a BB mobile number in Japan. The customer receives an alert on their mobile to withdraw this money from a BB agent. Until they withdraw, the remittance stays in a suspense account, earning the financial institute or the BB enabler float/interest on that money. When customer withdrawal is completed, the money moves from the suspense account to the account of the agent who facilitated the cash withdrawal.

A suspense account is an account in the general ledger in which amounts are temporarily recorded. A suspense account is used when the proper account cannot be determined at the time the transaction is recorded. When the proper account is determined, the amount will be moved from the suspense account to the proper account. It can also be used when there is a difference between the debit and credit side of a closing or trial balance, as a holding area until the reason for error is located and corrected.

Suspense accounts should be cleared at some point, because they are for temporary use. Suspense accounts are a control risk.

== See also ==
- Accountancy
