= John Wilson (public policy expert) =

Professor of Public Policy and Management at Glasgow Caledonian University

John Wilson, Professor of Public Policy and Management at Glasgow Caledonian University, and the Executive Dean and Pro Vice-Chancellor of the Glasgow School for Business and Society (since 2011). Wilson has edited/co-edited four books and published extensively on the provision and management of public services, particularly local government. His research focuses in particular on the economics and politics of public service provision, particularly local government.

He holds a BA (Hons) in Social Sciences from Manchester Metropolitan University, an MA in Politics from Lancaster University and a PhD from Liverpool John Moores University. He has served as Deputy Director of Liverpool Business School, Dean of Teesside Business School and Head of Salford Business School (2006–2011).

He was succeeded as Dean of Salford Business School by Amanda Broderick.

Professional and academic associations
Preceded by Dorothy J. Clayton	Editor of the Lancashire and Cheshire Antiquarian Society; 1989–1995	Succeeded by Morris Garratt
