= Emile Garcke =

English industrialist

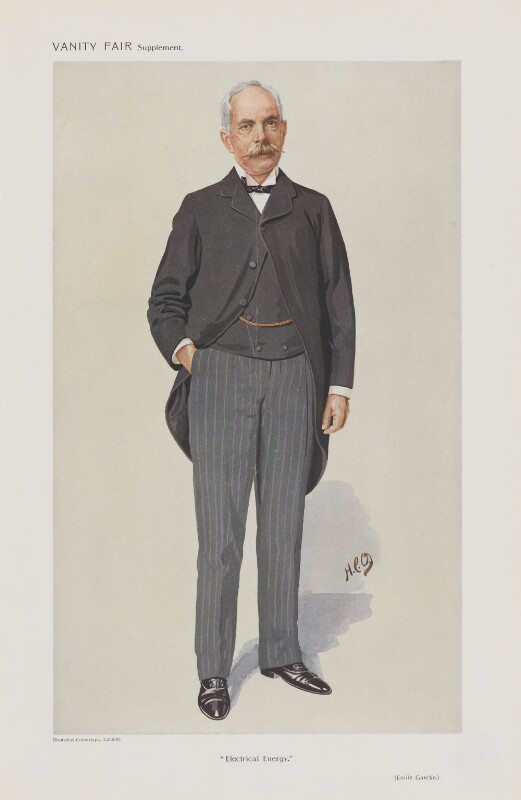
Garcke caricatured by HCO for Vanity Fair, 1910

Emile Oscar Garcke (1856 – 14 November 1930) was a naturalised British electrical engineer, industrial, commercial and political entrepreneur managing director of the British Electric Traction Company (BET), and early author on accounting. who is noted for writing the earliest standard text on cost accounting in 1887.

== Biography ==
Born in the Kingdom of Saxony in 1856, Garcke came to the United Kingdom of Great Britain and Ireland at an early age, becoming a naturalised British citizen in 1880.

In 1883 he became Secretary of the Anglo-American Brush Electric Light Corporation, was promoted to Manager in 1887 and became managing director of its successor company, Brush Electrical Engineering Company in 1891. In 1893 he was managing director of the Electric Construction Co and led its reorganisation.

He was a great believer in electric traction and set up the British Electric Traction Pioneer Co. in 1895. The following year he became managing director of the new company, now renamed British Electric Traction Co, which was involved in the electrification of tramways in Britain and abroad. The company became the largest private owner of tramways in the British Isles.

He was chairman of the council of the Industrial Co-partnership Association. and helped to found the British Institute of Philosophical Studies. He wrote a number of articles about the use of electricity for the 1911 edition of Encyclopædia Britannica for example the lemma on Electric lighting, and on the Telephone. He was also a keen publisher of electrical books, some of which were published as the “Manuals” series, such as Garcke's Manual of Electricity Supply, even after his death.

In London Garcke was the city's expert on electrical applications, and chaired the Electrical Committee of the London Chamber of Commerce. Garcke was elected Fellow of Royal Statistical Society, and member of the Institute of Actuaries.

Garcke retired in 1929 and died in 1930. He had married Alice, the daughter of John Withers, and had a son Sidney.

== Work ==
=== Factory accounts, their principles and practice, 1887 ===
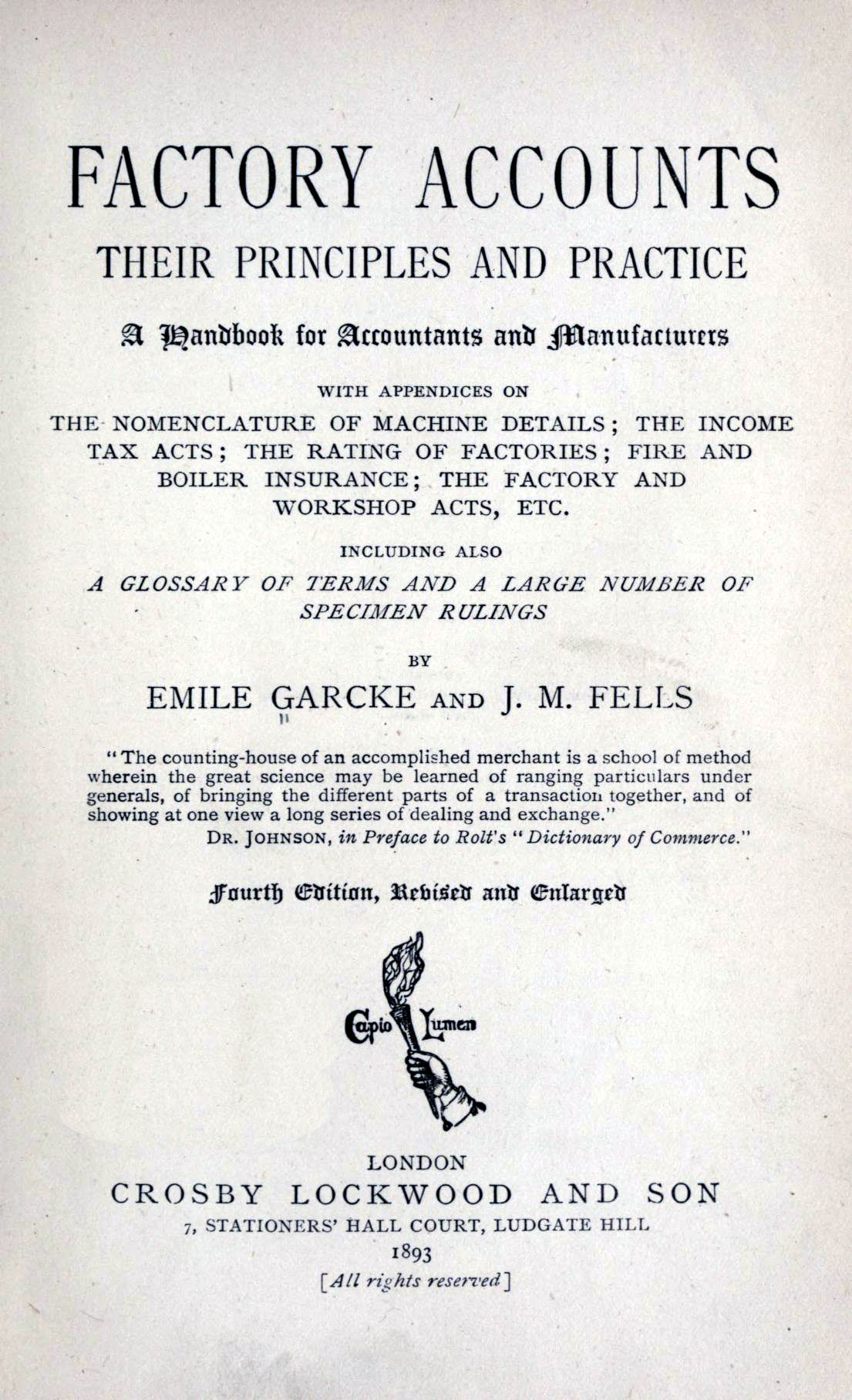
Factory accounts, their principles and practice, 2nd ed. 1889

In 1887 Garcke and the accountant John Manger Fells (1858-1925) published their book Factory accounts, their principles and practice. In the preface of the second edition they presented their work as the "first attempt to place before English readers a systematised statement of the principles regulating Factory Accounts; and of the methods by which those principles can be put into practice and made to serve important purposes in the economy of manufacture."

While works on general accounting and new accounting methods had been written since the renaissance, Garcke and Fells specifically focussed on the cost accounting for manufacturing.

=== The need for factory accounting ===
In the preface of the second edition of Factory Accounts (1889) Garcke and Fells further explained about the intention of this work.

It is not necessary to convince men of business of the advantages and importance of correct mercantile bookkeeping; but as regards their factories and warehouses they are for the most part content to accept accounts which are not capable of scientific verification. Such accounts can only be regarded as memoranda of transactions.
Our aim has been to show not only that as great a degree of accuracy can be attained in factory bookkeeping as in commercial accounts, but that the books of a manufacturing business can scarcely be said to be complete and reliable unless they are supplemented by, and to a large extent based upon, the accounts special to a factory.
The principles of Factory Accounts do not differ in the main from those general rules on which all sound book-keeping is based, and we have but applied fundamental axioms to the practice of an important and extending* branch of industrial accounts; and with the view of rendering the book of special utility to Accountants we have not dealt with the principles and practice of accounts in so far as they apply merely to elementary and commercial book-keeping, as to do so would, in large measure, be a work of supererogation.

One of the special features of this work was the additional eight page long glossary of terms, while other authors in those days embedded the meaning of term within their text.

=== Forms for factory administration ===
A main part of Garcke and Fells' Factory Accounts (1889) relates to the administration of factory events, and specifically the administration of labour, shop orders, stores, and stock with special procedures and forms.

The labour administration starts with the registration of labour time. This system is designed to secure, that "each person employed at a rate of pay on a time scale shall receive payment for the exact time employed." It involved the cooperation of work people, the foreman, the time clerk and a timekeeper, and should exclude collusion and fraud.

Forms for factory administration from Factory accounts, their principles and practice, 1889
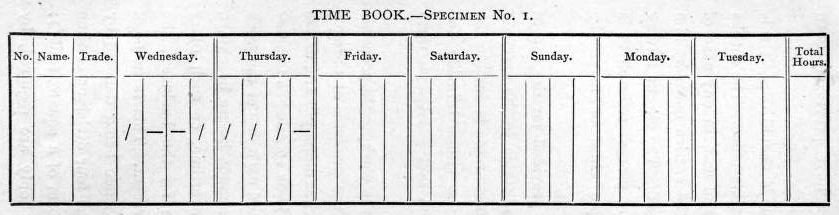
Time book, 1887 (1, 2, 3)

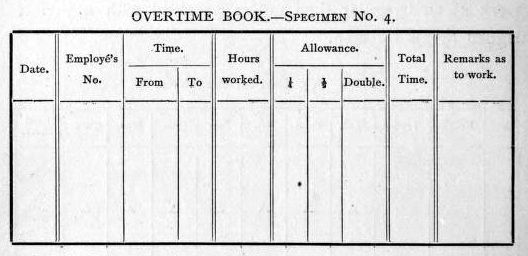
Overtime book, 1887 (4)

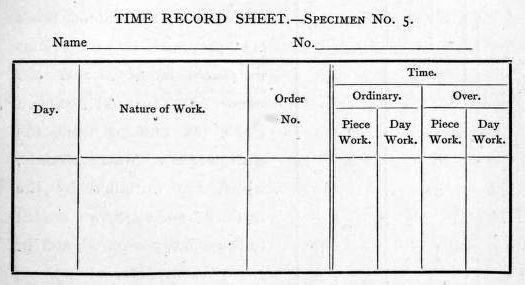
Time Record sheet, 1887 (5)

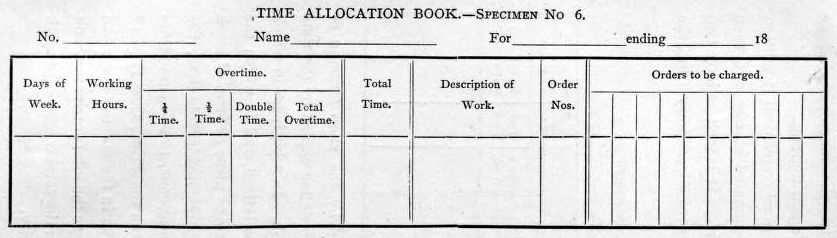
Time Allocation Book, 1887 (6)

The system includes multiple forms (see images):

- The Time Book in which the timekeeper records the presence or absence of the workforce.
- The Overtime book, a similar record for overtime.
- The Time Record sheet, a record how the day's time is spent initiated by the shop foremen.
- The Time Allocation Book, a summary of Time Record Sheets made up by the time clerk linked with the balance on Peace Work Sheets (10).

Based on these information, wages can be paid at the end of each period. The flow diagram I (see below) shows the relation of these books and forms used in connection with wages. Late 19th and early 20th century these methods for timekeeping, payroll accounting, and piece-rate analysis would significantly improve in theory practice.

Garcke and Fells continued their work with methods for stock and stores accounting. Diemer (1904) considered this the most meritorious part of the work. He noted, that it shows "in complete detail a system of requisitions, purchase orders, and stores-accounting records, by means of which double-entry balances may be kept on stores. The principles of the system are sound. A competent storekeeper or purchasing agent should find no difficulty in adapting the ideas of the authors to the requirements of the particular business with which he is connected." An overview of this system is pictured in the two flow diagrams (II en IV) below.

=== System of factory accounting ===
Garcke and Fells presented a system of factory accounting in which overall "prime costs were passed through a series of ledger accounts from raw materials to finished goods." This concept initiated here, has hardly been improved ever since.

This system makes a division of two major types of costs, labour costs and material costs.

- Labour costs, registered in a Wages Book or Sheet were determined by an allocation registration build from primary data and a timebook (diagram I).
- Material costs became registered on one side in a commercial ledger, and on the other side in a store ledger. (diagram II).

The system incorporated a work in process account. Hereto "materials and labor costs were transferred from stores and wages accounts to a summary manufacturing (work in process) account in the general ledger, which also received debits from the cashbook for expenditures directly applicable to the production process." Periodically (diagram III) the "prime costs of goods completed were transferred from the manufacturing account to a stock (finished goods) account, leaving the work in process in manufacturing and accumulating cost of goods manufactured in stock."

The System of factory accounting was presented by a series of four diagrams, visualizing the foundations of factory accounting:

Diagrams in Factory accounts, their principles and practice, 1889
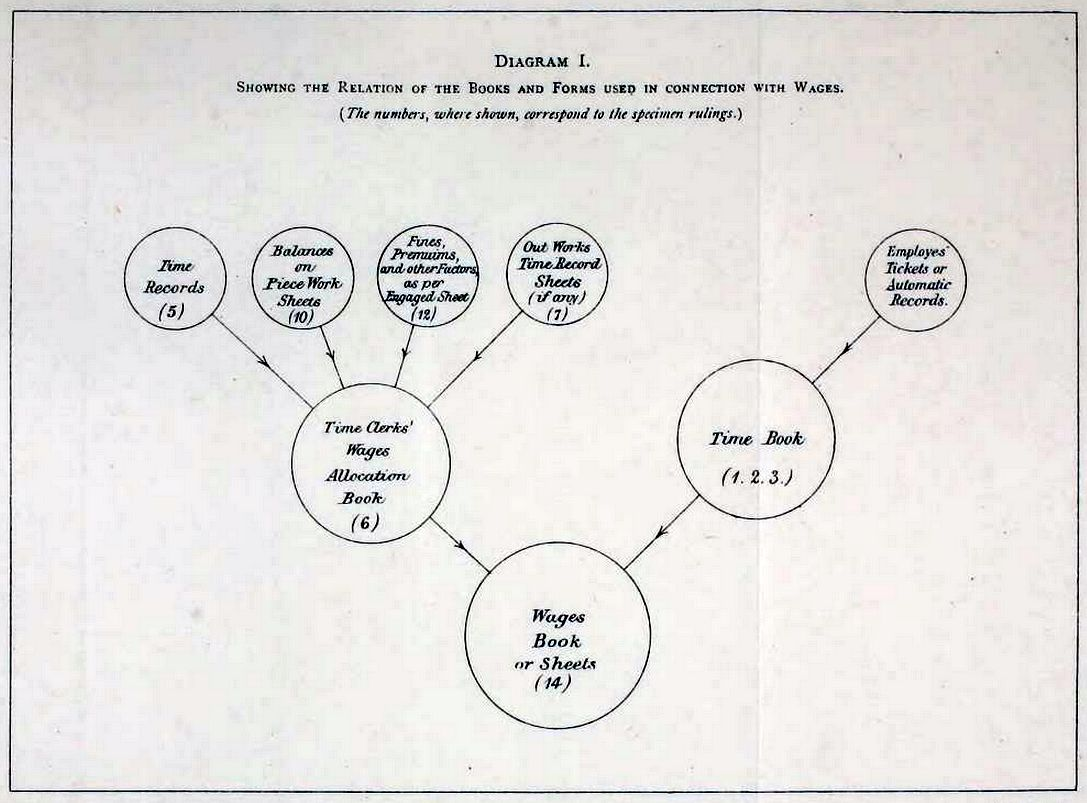
I Showing the relation of the Books and Forms used in connection with Wages

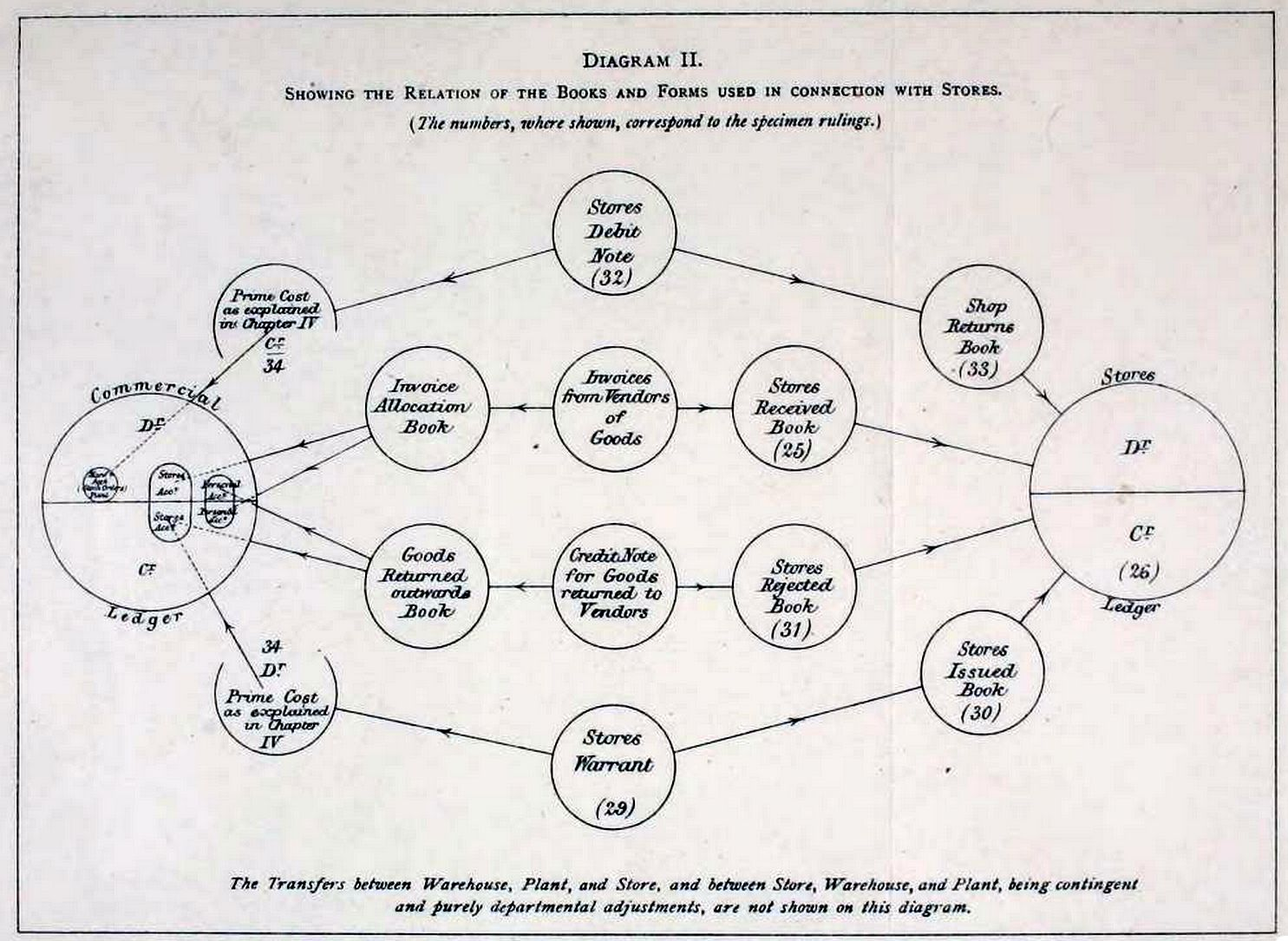
II Showing the relation of the Books and Forms used in connection with Stores

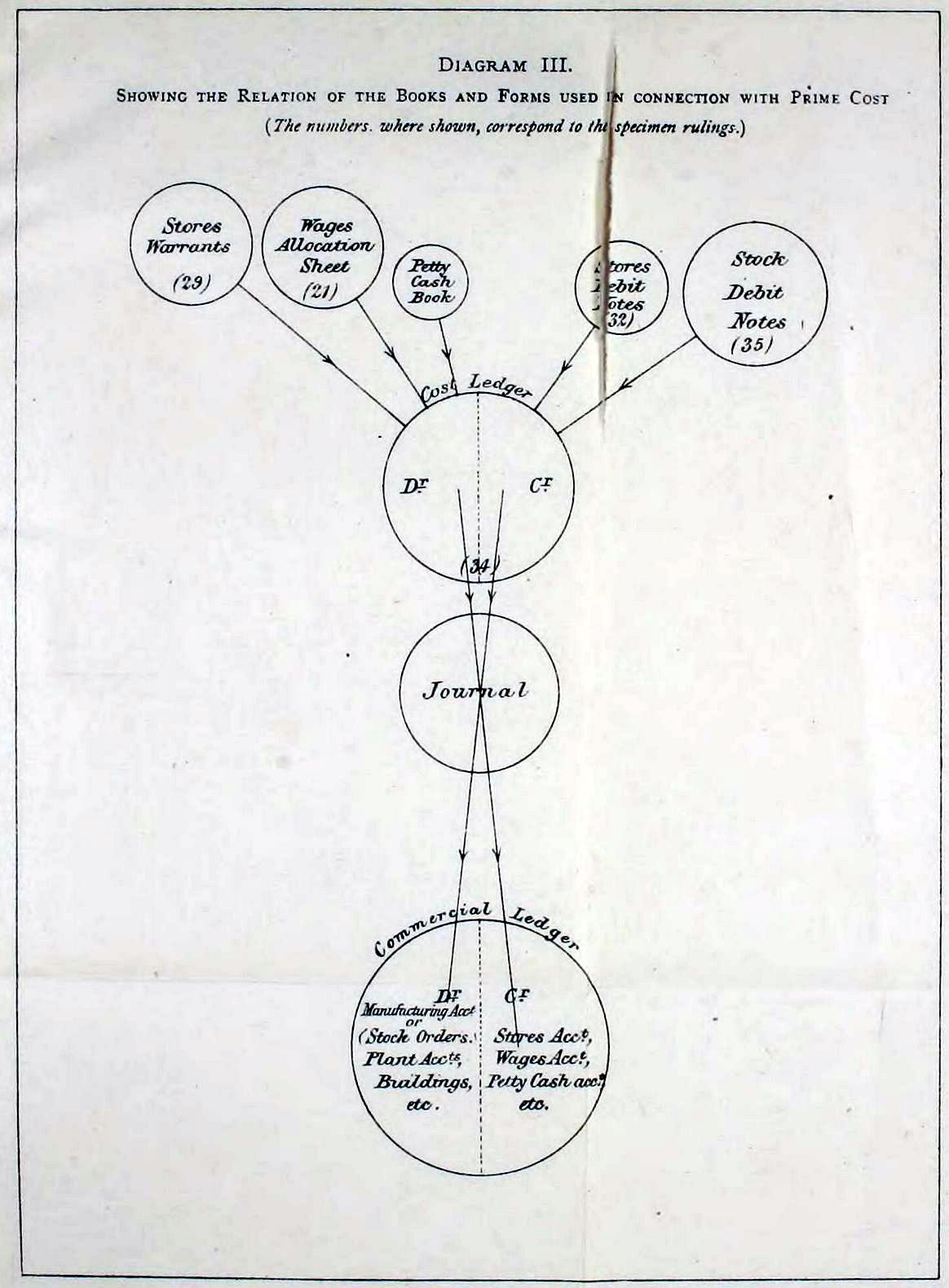
III Showing the relation of the Books and Forms used in connection with Prime Cost

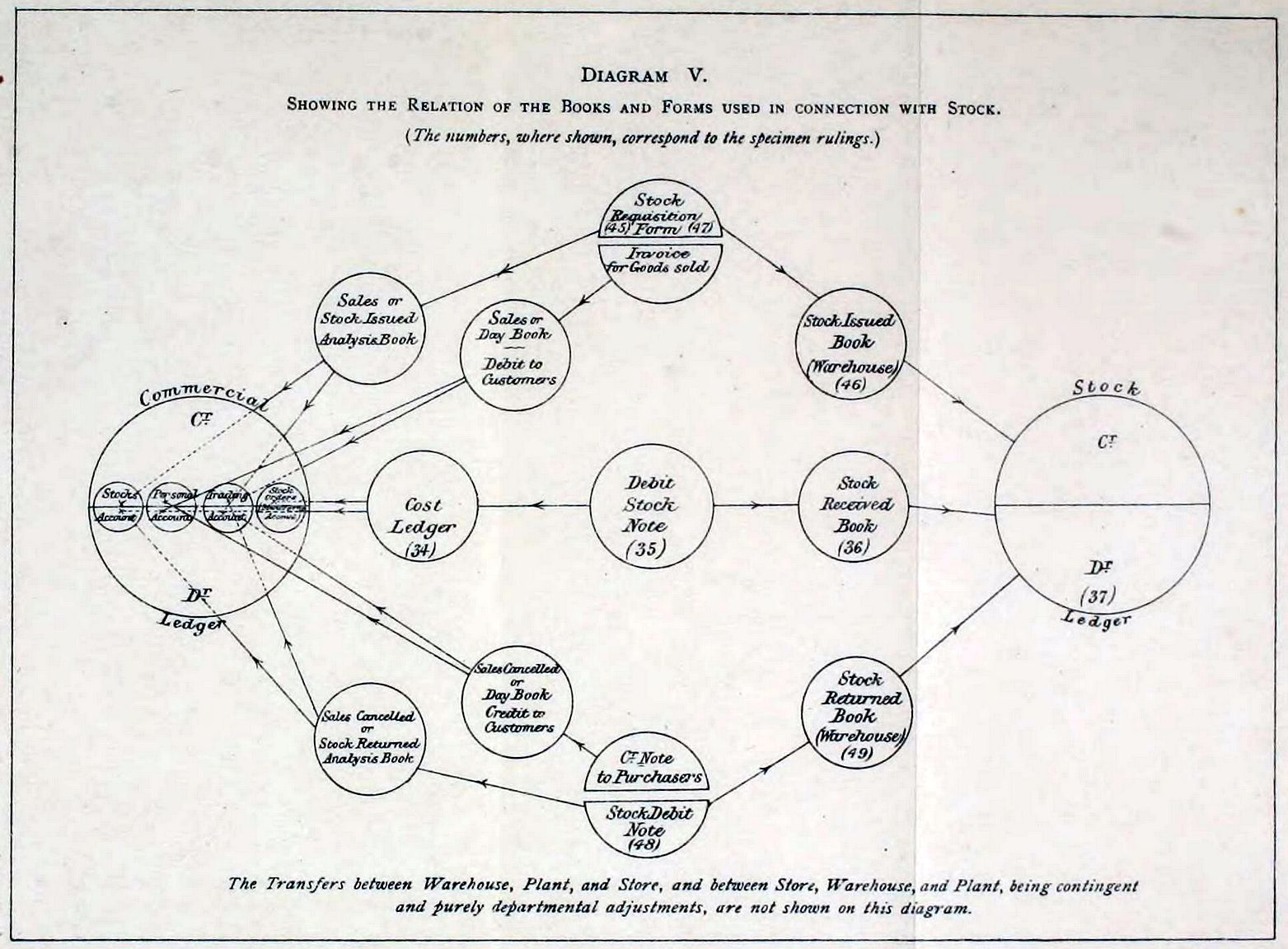
IV Showing the relation of the Books and Forms used in connection with Stock

Garcke and Fells (1889) commented, that they hoped that "the diagrams showing the relation between Factory and Commercial books will, with the numerous specimens the book contains, render the information we have to present of service to those who, while concerned in manufacture, and therefore interested in our subject, have not occasion to inquire closely into the practice of accounts."

The system of picturing manufacturing accounts has been further developed by J. Slater Lewis and others (see here), including James Alexander Lyons, who pictured various patterns of closing Loss & Gain accounts (see here).

=== Allocation of indirect costs and depreciation ===
An important element in Garcke and Fells' method of cost accounting was the allocation of indirect costs. They "suggested allocating the 'indirect costs' of producing a good proportionally to the amount of labour and materials costs used to make the item." As they (1887) explained:

In some establishments the direct expenditures in wages and materials only is considered to constitute the cost; and no attempt is made to allocate to the various working or stock orders any portion of the indirect expenses. Under this system the difference between the sum of the wages and materials expended on the articles and their selling price constitutes the gross profit, which is carried in the aggregate to the credit of profit and loss, the indirect factory expenses already referred to, together with the establishment expenses and depreciation, being particularised on the debit side of that account. This method has certainly simplicity in its favour, but a more efficient check upon the indirect expenses would be obtained by establishing a relation between them and the direct expenses. This may be done by distributing all the indirect expenses, such as wages of foremen, rent of factory, fuel, lighting, heating, and cleaning, etc. (but not the salaries of clerks, office rent, stationery and other establishment charges to be referred to later), over the various jobs, as a percentage, either upon the wages expended upon the jobs respectively, or upon the cost of both wages and materials.

According to Diewert (2001), the method proposed here was "rather crude" in compare to the "masterful analysis," that Alexander Hamilton Church would give in his 1908 "The Proper Distribution of Expense Burden."

Another innovation by Garcke and Fells was the "idea that deprecation was an admissible item of cost that should be allocated in proportion to the prime cost (i.e., labour and materials cost) of manufacturing an article but they explicitly ruled out interest as a cost." They explained:

The item of Depreciation may, for the purpose of taking out the cost, simply be included in the category of the indirect expenses of the factory, and be distributed over the various enterprises in the same way as those expenses may be allocated; or it may be dealt with separately and more correctly in the manner already alluded to and hereafter to be fully described. The establishment expenses and interest on capital should not, however, in any case form part of the cost of production. There is no advantage in distributing these items over the various transactions or articles produced. They do not vary proportionately with the volume of business. … The establishment charges are, in the aggregate, more or less constant, while the manufacturing costs fluctuate with the cost of labour and the price of material. To distribute the charges over the articles manufactured would, therefore, have the effect of disproportionately reducing the cost of production with every increase, and the reverse with every diminution, of business. Such a result is greatly to be deprecated, as tending to neither economy of management nor to accuracy in estimating for contracts. The principles of a business can always judge what percentage of gross profit upon cost is necessary to cover fixed establishment charges and interest on capital.

Diewert (2001) noticed that "the aversion of accountants to include interest as a cost can be traced back to this quotation."

== Reception ==
=== Early 20th century ===
Late 19th century and early 20th century Factory accounts, their principles and practice by Garcke and Fells turned out to be a popular and influential work on cost accounting. It was republished until the last 7th edition in 1922.

In 1910 J.M. Fells himself in The Accountancy, looked back and made the following remarks:

It is now some 23 years or so ago that my friend Mr. Emile Garcke and I, in the flush of our youth, wrote the first pioneering book on this subject. Then it seemed to be thought by some that we had written a book on economics, and not one on accountancy. The Accountant, which performs a most useful service in always representing the average mind of the profession, pointed out that the work was rather concerned with the wages and time books, stock books, and matters of a similar nature, which, as a rule did not come within the scope of an accountant's duties...

Fells is referring here to the words of an accountant, which was already mentioned the preface of the 2nd edition of their work (1889, p. 4). Now in 1910 Fells continued:

In reviews of succeeding editions of this book, as also in the reviews of the numerous other books, many of them most excellent in character, which have since been published dealing with the same subject, has been seen the growth of perception in the average professional mind that in the direction of cost accounting accountancy could do useful and remunerative work of the greatest service to the industrial and trading community. The need for scientific cost systems is being felt not only amongst industrial nations in the western, but also among those in the eastern hemisphere, and not the least pleasant incidents to me, in connection with the time and attention I have given to the subject, has been to advice with accountants in India thereon and to find Japanese accountants placing themselves in correspondence with me as to the best means of calling in Japan the importance of this subject.

In his Bibliography of Works Management Hugo Diemer (1904) listed Garcke and Fells' work among the foremost works on work management. Diemer summarized, that "In a preface the authors state that their aim has been to show that as great a degree of accuracy can be attained in factory bookkeeping as in commercial accounts." And furthermore:

The authors make a clear statement of the distinction between materials for manufacture and articles complete in the manufactured state. Until materials are converted into finished products of sale they are spoken of as "stores," but when so converted they are termed "stock." The accounts in the "Prime Cost Ledger" are debited with wages and materials spent in manufacture and are credited with the stock produced. Of 264 pages, 148 are devoted to descriptions of methods of accounting. The remainder of the volume consists of appendices, composed largely of British Factory and Work-Shop Acts.

Diemer (1904) already stipulated, what Diewert (2001), Boyns (2006) and Parker (2013) confirms, that the matter of the distribution of indirect costs was not worked out that well. Diemer described "the matter of labor costs and distribution of indirect expenses has not been worked out as fully as the stores problem. The double-entry balance principle is carried still further into a method of balancing the manufactured stock ledger accounts with the commercial ledger. Charts built up of circles and arrows, and tracing the relationships of forms and accounts, serve to simplify the schemes proposed, and to make clear the underlying principles."

=== 21st century ===
Trevor Boyns & John Richard Edwards (2006) acknowledged the Factory accounts, their principles and practice as the "earliest standard text on cost accounting," It marked the beginning of modern cost accounting; the process of collecting, analyzing, summarizing and evaluating various alternative courses of action. It was however so that this work primary focussed on the identification and classification of costs. The scope of the field of cost accounting has further developed in the use of accounting methods as aid to management.

Parker (2013) concluded that Garcke and Fells had written a leading book on cost accounting, but that their impact on accounting for decision making and control was limited. A restriction in their work was their argument that "all manufacturing costs fluctuated with the cost of labour and the price of material, and should therefore be allocated to products." On the other hand, they assumed that "the 'establishment expenses' (by which they meant administrative and selling costs) were, in the aggregate, more or less constant and should not be so allocated, because that would 'have the effect of disproportionately reducing the cost of each, with every increase, and the reverse with every diminution of business'." In comparison with the contemporary understanding of fixed costs and variable cost, the distinction made here is still limited.

== Selected publications ==
Books:

- Emile Garcke and J. M. Fells. Factory accounts, their principles and practice; a handbook for accountants and manufacturers with appendices on the nomenclature of machine details; the income tax acts; the rating of factories; fire and boiler insurance; the factory and workshop acts, etc.; including also a glossary of terms and a large number of specimen rulings. 1887; 2nd ed. 1889; 4th ed. rev. & enl, 1893; 5th ed. 1911; 6th ed. 1922.
- Garcke, Emile. The progress of electrical enterprise. Electrical Press Limited, 1907.

Annual review:

- Emile Garcke et al. (eds.). Manual of electrical undertakings, 1897 to 1960

Articles, a selection:

- "Electricity Supply" . Encyclopædia Britannica. Vol. 9 (11th ed.). 1911. pp. 193–203.
- "Lighting" . Encyclopædia Britannica. Vol. 16 (11th ed.). 1911. pp. 651–673. (Electric (Commercial Aspects))
- "Railways" . Encyclopædia Britannica. Vol. 22 (11th ed.). 1911. pp. 819–861. (Light Railways (in part))
- "Telegraph" . Encyclopædia Britannica. Vol. 26 (11th ed.). 1911. pp. 510–541. (Commercial Aspects)
- "Telephone" . Encyclopædia Britannica. Vol. 26 (11th ed.). 1911. pp. 547–557. (Commercial Aspects)
- "Tramway" . Encyclopædia Britannica. Vol. 27 (11th ed.). 1911. pp. 159–167.
