= John Manger Fells =

British incorporated accountant

John Manger Fells CBE (1858 – 7 December 1925) was a British incorporated accountant consultant, and author on accounting. He was known as promoter of cost accounting and leading cost accountant in Britain early 20th century.

== Biography ==
Fells was a tailor's son, who came into prominence as secretary of Zetetical Society early 1880s, where he crossed paths with Sidney Webb and Emile Garcke. He took classes in intermediate arithmetic, mathematics, composition, dictation, and English History at the Birkbeck Literary and Scientific Institution in 1872 and 1873.

In 1887 Fells had become assistant secretary at the Brush Electrical Light Corporation, which was directed by Emile Garcke in those days. With Garcke he co-authored with the book "Factory Accounts: Their Principles and Practice." In the next decades this books was published in seven editions, and was still in use in Britain as educational text in the early 1930s. Fells joined the SAA accounting association in 1902, and was later elected fellow of the ICWA. He became known as authority in the field of cost accounting.

Early in the 1900s Fells became chairman of the mining corporation Kent Collieries, by 1911 he was director of three mining corporations with operations in Burma and Australia. and later worked as consultant for the British industry and lectured accountants in India and Japan.

In World War I Fells served as Private Secretary to the Surveyor-General of Supply in the War Office, and was appointed a CBE, Civilian War Honour, in 1920.

== Work ==
=== Financial accounting and cost accounting ===
As authority in the field of cost accounting, Fells was engaged in promoting the profession and the legal status of the profession. In those days there was a big difference between financial accounting and cost accounting. Locke (1979) recalled:

[Financial accounting was] a liberal profession made up of independent wealthy businessmen who did not work directly for industry but acted as consultants, working out of their own offices, much as lawyers do. The chartered or incorporated accountants, moreover, were not even exposed to cost accounting during their training, for as young “articled” clerks they were apprenticed to accounting offices instead of formally educated in colleges or universities. They could only learn what happened in the offices and, since the accountants seldom dealt with costing matters neither did the apprentices. The clerks who kept cost records in British industry were not chartered or incorporated accountants. They were poor, badly educated men who received what training they got on the job in a factory bookkeeping office. They hardly ever came into professional contact with public accountants who, in any case, despised them because of their lower class origins.

In 1910 J.M. Fells remarked that public accountants still "did not consider these industrial cost accountants to be engaged in accounting."

== Selected publications ==
- J. M. Fells, G.B. Shaw, Sidney Webb et al. The Zetetical Society: Programme for the Session 1881-82. Zetetical Society, London.
- Emile Garcke and J. M. Fells. Factory accounts, their principles; a handbook for accountants and manufacturers with appendices on the nomenclature of machine details; the income tax acts; the rating of factories; fire and boiler insurance; the factory and workshop acts, etc.; including also a glossary of terms and a large number of specimen rulings. 1887; 2nd ed. 1889; 4th ed., rev. and enl, 1893.
- J.M. Fells (1909). The Budget and the Taxation of Land.
- John Manger Fells. Accountancy in Relation to Cost and Market Prices, Etc. London, 1923.

Articles, a selection:

- J.M. Fells. "Cost Accounting," in: Incorporated Accountants' Students' Society of London. 1910. p. 160-161
- Fells, J. M. "The Accountancy of Tomorrow," The Incorporated Accountants’ Journal, 22 (July, 1912), pp. 69–74.
- Fells, John M. "Some principles governing the ascertainment of cost." Incorporated Accountants’ Journal (1919): 31–34.
- Fells, J. M. "Industrial Economics'." The Incorporated Accountants' Journal, (1922): 123–6.
