= Frederick Hutton =

Frederick Hutton may refer to:

- Frederick Hutton (Royal Navy officer) (1801–1866), British naval officer
- Frederick Hutton (scientist) (1836–1905), English scientist active in New Zealand
- Frederick Remsen Hutton (1853–1918), American mechanical engineer
- Fred Hutton, Canadian politician from Newfoundland and Labrador
