= John Tregoning =

American mechanical engineer, inventor and business manager

John Tregoning (c. 1845 – c. 1920) was an American mechanical engineer, inventor and business manager from Lynn, Massachusetts, known for writing one of the first books on factory operations in 1891. and as early systematizer of management.

== Biography ==
Tregoning was educated as mechanical engineer and had started his career in industry in the 1860s. In the 1870s he was living in New York city, when he filed his first patents requests. In the 1880s he made it superintendent at the Mather Electric Company in Manchester, Connecticut. In 1888 he accepted the appointment as superintendent of the Thomson Electric Welding Company in Lynn, Massachusetts, and in 1890 he became superintendent of the machine factory Nicholson & Waterman Works in Providence, R.I.

In the 1870s Tregoning had come into prominence, while he invented and patented a mechanical improvement for a steam pump. In the 1880s he shifted his attention as inventor to electrical devices and patented a series op electrical designs such as a globe supporter for electric lamps (1882), an electric arc lamp (1883); and electrical indicator (1884), a collector (1884), and an electric switch (1899). Furthermore, in the field of mechanical engineering he patented among others a self-oiling box or journal (1890), a valve operation mechanism (1891), and a Combination Slash Lock (1914).

In 1891 Tregoning published the seminal work "A Treatise on Factory Management: Being a Comprehensive and Practical Scheme for the Better Management of Factories." This work earned him a place among other early management authors of the late 19th century, such as Captain Henry Metcalfe, Henry R. Towne, Emile Garcke, J. Slater Lewis and Horace Lucian Arnold They were the first foremost authors, who "developed systems of shop orders to control the flow of orders through factories."

== Work ==
Tregoning came into prominences in the 1870s after some of his inventions were published in Scientific American, but he is most noted for his 1891 treatise on factory management.

=== Improved Steam Valve for pumping engines ===
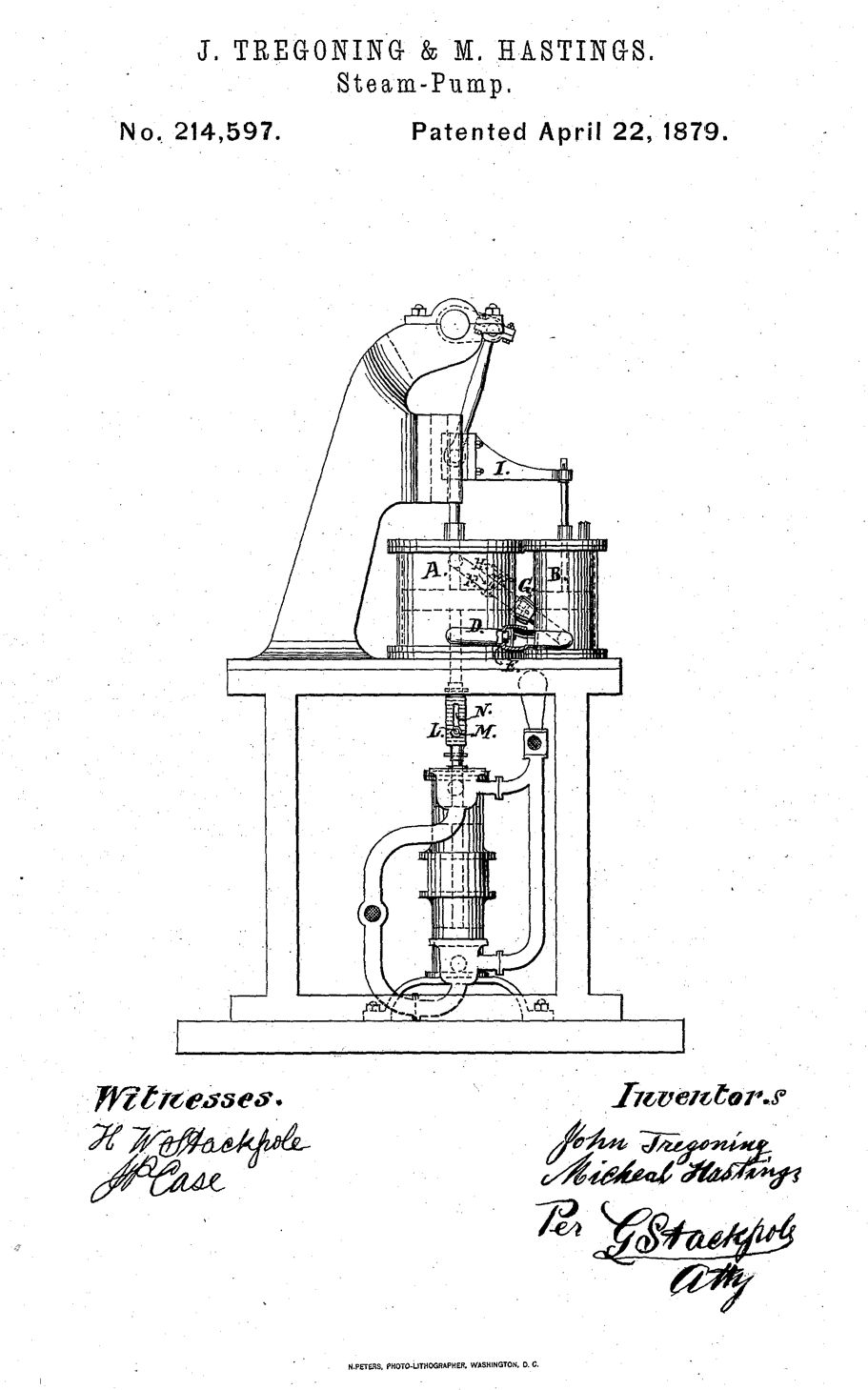
Patent drawing of improved steam valve, 1879

In 1877 Tregoning filed his first patent request for an improved steam valve for pumping engines (see picture), and another patent in cooperation with Michael Hastings of Brooklyn, N.Y. for another improved pump valve. Both inventions were described the next year in the "New Engineering Inventions" section of Scientific American, August 1878, as follows.

John Tregoning, of Brooklyn, N. Y., has patented an improved Steam Valve for pumping engines, which consists in a circumferentially grooved piston rod, which acts as a valve, and in passages that lead from the ends of the valve chest to and across the cylinder heads, and to the exhaust receiver of the cylinder, the said passages being crossed between the valve chest and cylinder heads.
John Tregoning and Michael Hastings, of Brooklyn, N. Y., have jointly patented an improved Pump Valve, which consists in a semi-cylindrical valve fitted to a suitable valve seat, and provided with recesses in each end for receiving a head formed on the rod of a small piston. A piston is connected with each end of the valve, and works in a chamber or cylinder formed at the end of the water way in the valve seat. Communications relating to either of these two inventions should be addressed to Mr. John Farrell, No. 30 Water street, Brooklyn, or to Mr. John Tregoning, 38 Gold street, New York city.

The patents were granted the next year, 1879, by the United States Patent and Trademark Office. In the 1880s Tregoning would turn to developing electrical devices, which also drew some attention. One of his designs for an electrical switch was even pictured in the French La Lumiére électrique journal in 1887.

=== A Treatise on Factory Management, 1891 ===
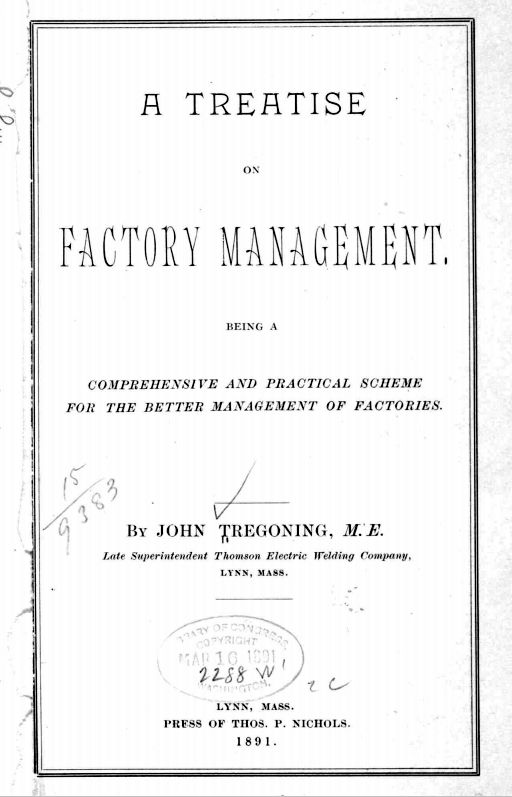
A Treatise on Factory Management title page, 1891.

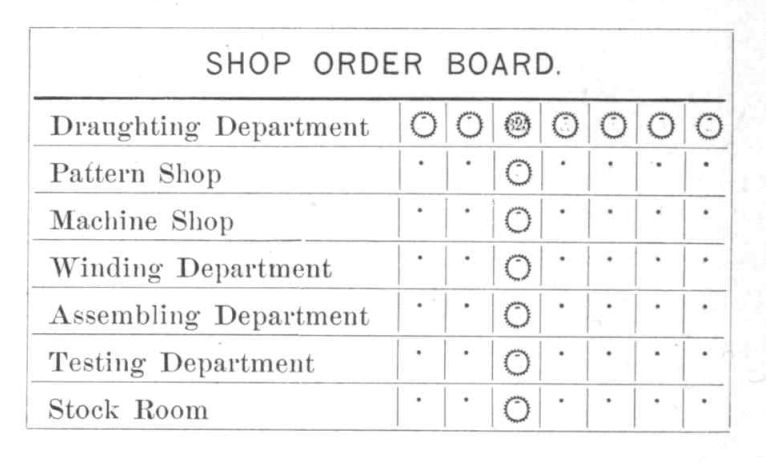
Shop Order Board, 1891

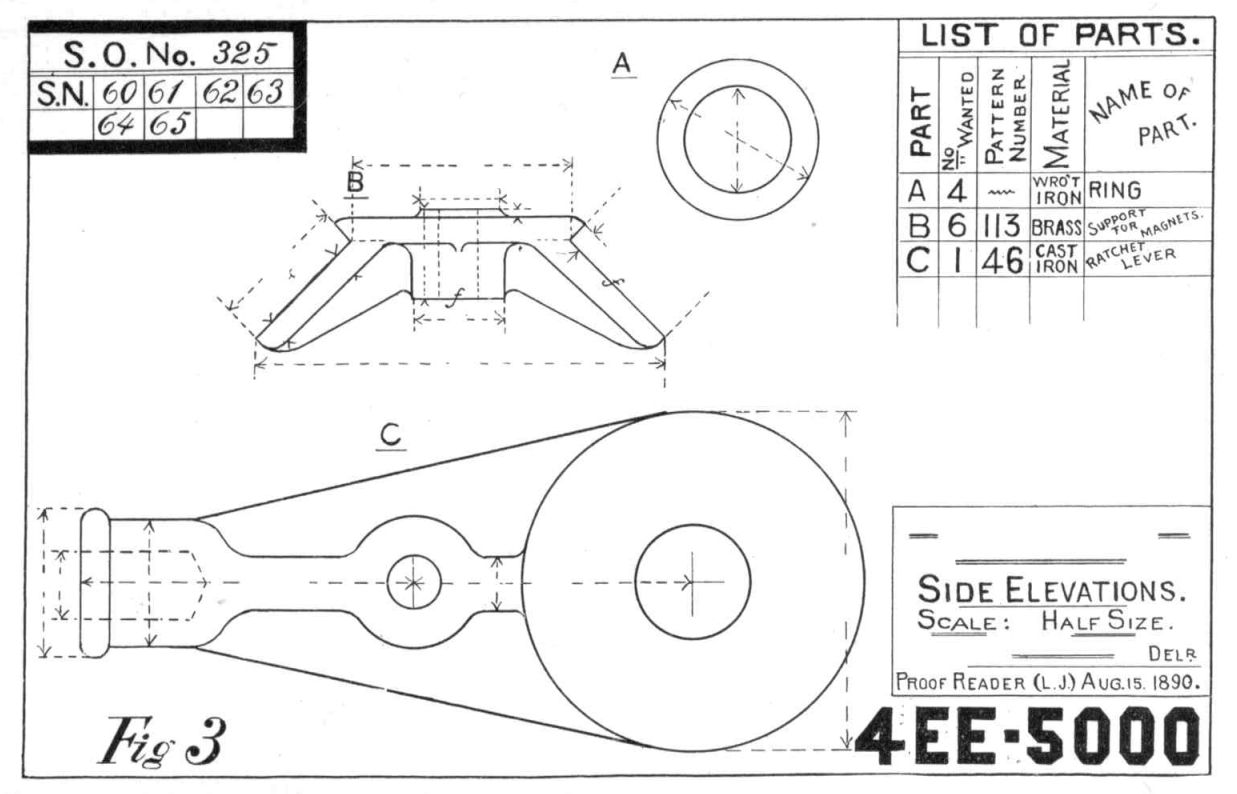
Technical drawing, 1891

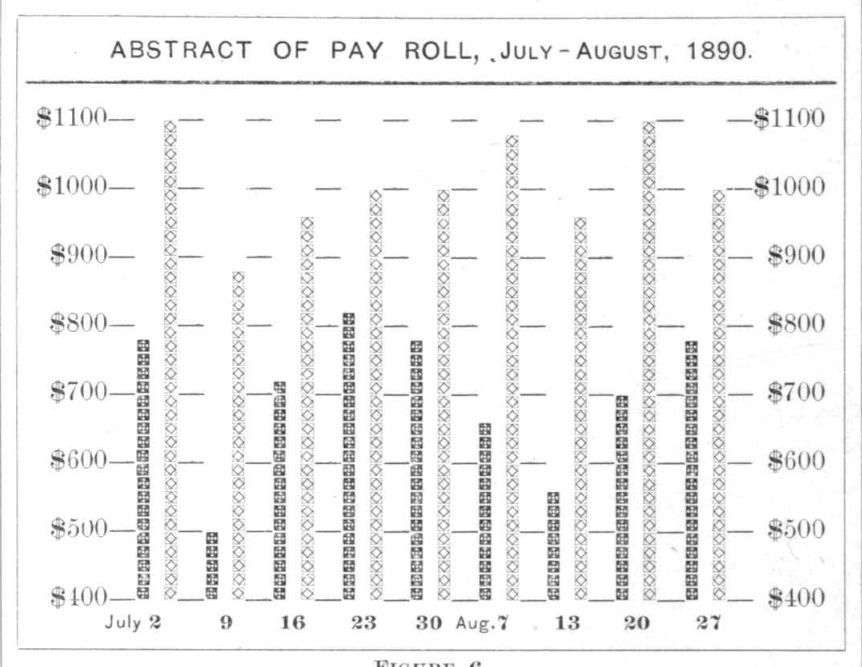
Abstract of Pay Roll, 1891

As mechanical engineer and later superintendent of the Thomas Electric Welding Company and other companies, Tregoning had personally witnessed the vigorous growth of the American industry in the last decades of the 19th century. The scale of enterprises had significantly grown, and new large-scale enterprises emerged from the merger of existing companies. Due to increased specialization and division of labour and high scale production these enterprises became more complex to coordinate and to manage. A new field of operational problems around the management of factory operations emerged.

In 1891 Tregoning wrote a book about his experiences and ideas, called A Treatise on Factory Management. With this work he was one of the first to supply a more systematic approach to management. Predecessors, such as Captain Henry Metcalfe (1885) had written about the operation and management of the military arsenal, and Joseph Nasmith (1884) was focussed on textile industry. Tregoning focussed in general on a "more detailed method for factory organization," which could be useful in any job shop, machine shop, or factory.

=== The need for methods for factory organisation ===
In his "A Treatise on Factory Management" Tregoning started his essay by giving a summary of the state of management in his days, and the need for method or methodology in the management:

It has been said that "Systems" is the triumph of "Mind Over Matter," and there is no doubt about the truth herein contained; we only get suspicious of the fact when taking a measured survey of the inner workings of some large factories, and gaze sorrowfully at the triumph of matter over mind.
To work systematically is to work successfully. Method is the essential element on which every solid and substantial concern is based; and that factory, institution, or establishment of any kind which ignores it, conveys to the observer an impression that nothing permanent or abiding is intended, whilst on the other hand a systematised manner of working stamps it at once with permanency — an establishment that means business and intends to carry it on for all time.
I have heard it remarked that in business three things are necessary : knowledge, temper, and time; but I have seen all three prostrate and powerless for want of method in the management. Such is the evil of working in an unmethodical and slipshod manner, that it is not too much to say results have followed well-nigh ruinous to the concern.

And furthermore Tregoning complains about the lack of advances in the field:

There is no doubt that the subject of factory organisation has been badly neglected in past years. That we have not advanced with the order of the times is the complaint I lodge against the doors of many managers. We are working on old systems which have served their day and generation — systems which 'have had their day' but, unfortunately have not 'ceased to be'; for a brief glance at many of them, both great and small, wall prove that little or no method is used, and that the concern moves under conditions which are disgraceful; the wonder is how it moves at all.

=== The need for coordination and systematization ===
Tregoning referred, as Jacoby (2004) recalled, to the "rapid growth of the machine shops and other metalworking establishments [which] had led to internal disorder and [where] greater coordination and systematization were required if production speed was to be increased." As Tregoning mentioned:

My observations have led me to conclude — and I say it after twenty years' experience — that the first and foremost want of many of our large factories is not work, but a thorough revision of the machinery that manages and directs the whole concern. It is not a want of brains, it is not the difficulty of working out a vast and complicated scheme, it is not a matter involving the company in a large outlay of money — it is simply a question of method — the application of a few simple rules, and a respect for the time-honoured principle that order is the first law of the universe, and the nearer our approach to it the more harmonious will our arrangements work.

Litterer (1963) argued, that Tregoning shared with all late-nineteenth-century a "pursuit of controlling the workplace more efficiently," despite a diversity of opinions among them. Tregonings ideal:

A perfect organisation I consider an essential and vital element in securing success, in whatever form of institution we may wish to carry on, whether political or religious, mechanical or social. I contend that it is not possible to found a lasting power upon a management in which systematic action is eliminated or ignored; a ramshackle condition of things is the ultimatum; and in many cases establishments have closed simply through a break-up from within of its managing machinery.

Eight years later J. Slater Lewis cited Tregonings characterization in the Engineering Magazine (1899), and concluded that "it will be seen... that establishing new works for the profitable introduction of specialised machinery in order to arrive at maximum production is a matter of great complexity, involving questions of the highest importance, which must vary in accordance with the surroundings of each particular trade."

The new system for coordination and systematization, Tregoning proposed in his work, contained the structural application of tools as shop order books, technical drawings, and graphics for analysis costs (see images).

=== Shop Order Board and Shop Order Card ===
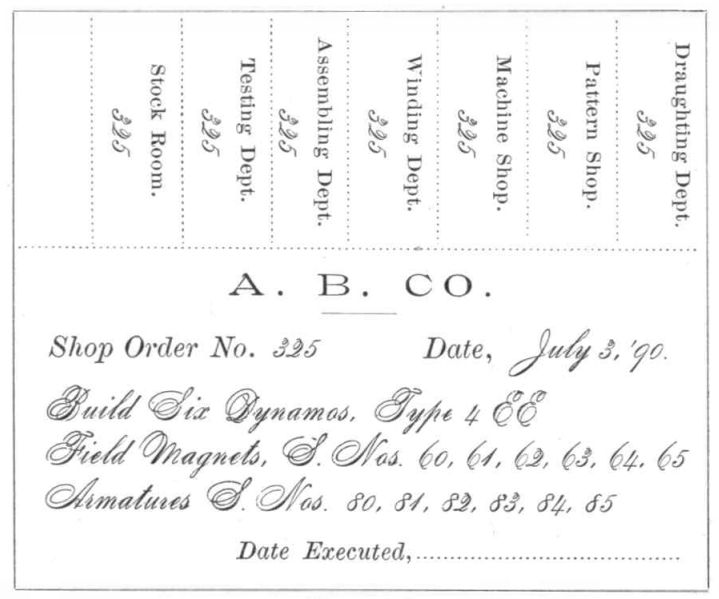
Shop Order Card, 1891

Shop Order Board is "made to represent any number of departments, also any number of shop orders, and is placed in the. Superintendent's office, where it is under the care of someone connected with this room. say the stenographer, how will see that to the proper distribution of the tags are hanging on the board with corresponding numbers to those on the orders sent into the factory, when there is any notice placed in the table of the party in charge to show that certain tags should change departments on the board."

Tregonings system of shop control used shop order cards (see illustration). This card is "filled out... with the serial numbers for the six machines to be built. Attached to the shop order card are coupons on which are written the departments corresponding with this on the board, also the shop order number."

=== Systemic management ===
Tregoning was late 19th century among a growing group of engineers, who had taken an interest in economic variables of the factory system. Tregoning didn't see, as already stated above, any solution in "involving the company in a large outlay of money - it is simply a question of method, the application of a few rules."

Guillén (1944) recalled, that in Tregonings days "cost accounting, production and inventory controls, and piecework rates were introduced not only to ease the 'labor problem' but also to improve on the wasteful use of raw materials and capital equipment. Various piecework systems were tried, including the famous Halsey, Gantt, and Taylor schemes. The effective application of productivity-based wage schedules reinforced the unfolding of cost accounting, which had been neglected for decades despite rapid industrial growth. The simultaneous development of cost accounting, production-control procedures, inventory controls, and piecework schemes was the most important aspect of the movement towards more systematic management practices in industry."

Late 19th century Tregoning had a pioneering role in advocating methods of factory management. He presented a series of tools, but didn't deliver a complete system as Frederick A. Halsey, Henry Gantt, Frederick Winslow Taylor and other pioneers did early 20th century.

== Selected publications ==
- John Tregoning. A Treatise on Factory Management: Being a Comprehensive and Practical Scheme for the Better Management of Factories. Press of Thos. P. Nichols, 1891.

== Patents ==
- 1878. Patents US201468 - improved Pump Valve; jointly patented with Michael Hastings,
- 1878. Patent US 214597 - Improvement in steam-pumps.
- 1882. Patent US 255212 - Globe supporter for electric lamps.
- 1884. Patent US 336176 - Electric Arc lamp.
- 1883. Patents US 382914 - Electrical indicator
- 1884. Patents US 394797 - Collector.
- 1890. Patent US 421991 - Self-oiling box or journal.
- 1891. Patent US 462805 - Valve-operating mechanism.
- 1899. Patent US 637892 - Electric switch.
- 1914. Patents US 1093955 - Combination Slash Lock and Alarm .
