= Horace Lucian Arnold =

American engineer, inventor, journalist (1837-1915)

- Born: June 25, 1837; New York
- Died: January 25, 1915 (aged 77); Detroit
- Occupations: Engineer, inventor, engineering journalist

Horace Lucian Arnold (June 25, 1837 – January 25, 1915) was an American engineer, inventor, engineering journalist and early American writer on management, who wrote about shop management, cost accounting, and other specific management techniques. He also wrote under the names Hugh Dolnar, John Randol, and Henry Roland.

With Henry R. Towne, Henry Metcalfe, Emile Garcke, John Tregoning and Slater Lewis he is known as early systematizer of management of the late 19th century.

== Biography ==
Born in New York, Arnold grew up in Lafayette, Walworth County, Wisconsin. Here Arnold started his career working in machine shops. For twelve years he was journeyman machinist in western river and lake engine shops. Subsequently, he was superintendent at the Ottawa Machine Shop and Foundry; department foreman at the E. W. Bliss Company; superintendent at the Stiles & Parker Press Company of Norman C. Stiles; and designer for the Pratt and Whitney Company in Hartford, Connecticut. In those days Arnold had also started inventing new tools. In 1858 he had patented his first invention, a marble saw.

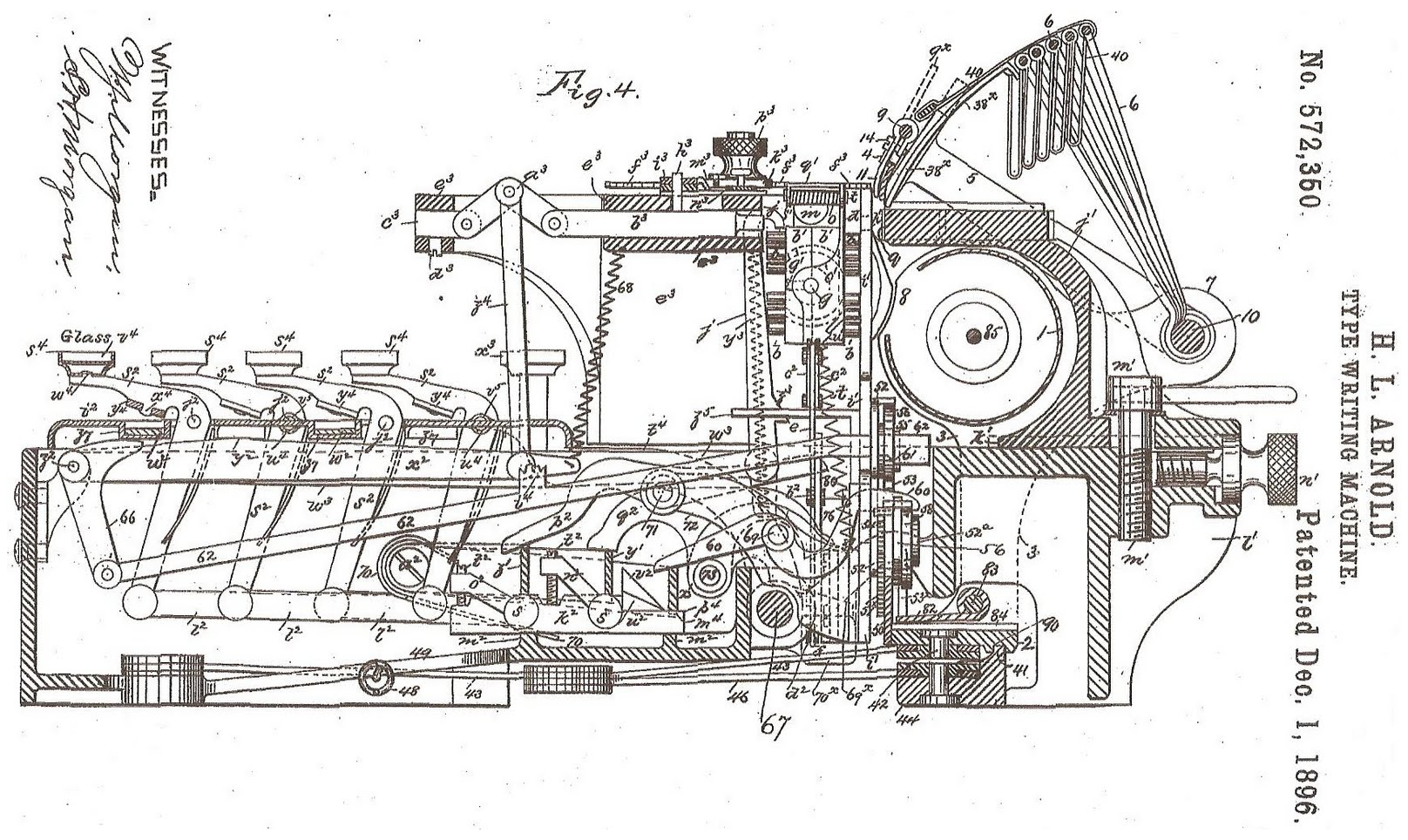
Type Writing Machine by Arnold, 1896

In the next ten years Arnold moved to work at places from Ottawa, Illinois; Grand Rapids, Michigan; Middletown, Connecticut; eventually to Brooklyn, New York, where he would stay. He continued to research and invented a range of products from "metal cutters to recorders, book binding, book stitching and book covering machines, mixers, letter locks..., piston water meters and water motors, knitting machines, 'explosive' and internal combustion engines and combustion generators, and clutches."

Late 1880s Arnold started his own typewriter company. In the 1890s he started as a technical journalist for journals such as the Engineering Magazine, the Automobile Trade Journal, and the American Machinist.. He wrote his articles using different pen names of which Henry Roland and Hugh Dolnar were the best known. Arnold also wrote at least three books published by the Engineering Magazine Press in New York.

Arnold died of pneumonia in Detroit on January 25, 1915, at the age of 77. An article in Business Week (1966) recalled, that "every reader of the Engineering Magazine knew what the connection was: Arnold had died on the job of tracking down the full Ford story."

== Work ==
=== Engineering Magazine, 1895-1914 ===
In the 1890s Arnold started writing on technology and management subjects in Engineering Magazine, and would continue to contribute until his death. In 1898 H.M. Norris reviewed

Mr. Henry Roland's [Horace L. Arnold's] many valuable contributions on this subject to The Engineering Magazine afford a rare opportunity for the study of the practice followed by many leading firms, and contain much of interest to every one connected with shop management. His incisive drawing of the difficulties to be met and overcome in the re-organization of an old and well-established business will strike home to the hearts of many managers. If proprietors could be brought to a better understanding of what a strong organization would mean to them, the work of the manager would be much simplified.

For this work Arnold is nowadays considered among the foremost early writers on management techniques, such as wage systems, production control and inventory control. He was among the foremost writers of the late 19th century, such as Henry R. Towne, Henry Metcalfe, John Tregoning and Slater Lewis; and among early 20th-century authors as Frederick Winslow Taylor, C.E. Knoeppel, Harrington Emerson, Clinton Edgar Woods, Charles U. Carpenter, Alexander Hamilton Church and Henry Gantt.

=== Modern Machine-Shop Economics, 1896 ===
In 1896 Arnold wrote a first series of articles for the Engineering Magazine about machine shops, entitled "Modern Machine-Shop Economics." This work stretched out from production technology, production methods and factory lay-out to time studies, production planning, and machine shop management. Some of the companies still exist.

Modern Machine-Shop Economics, 1896
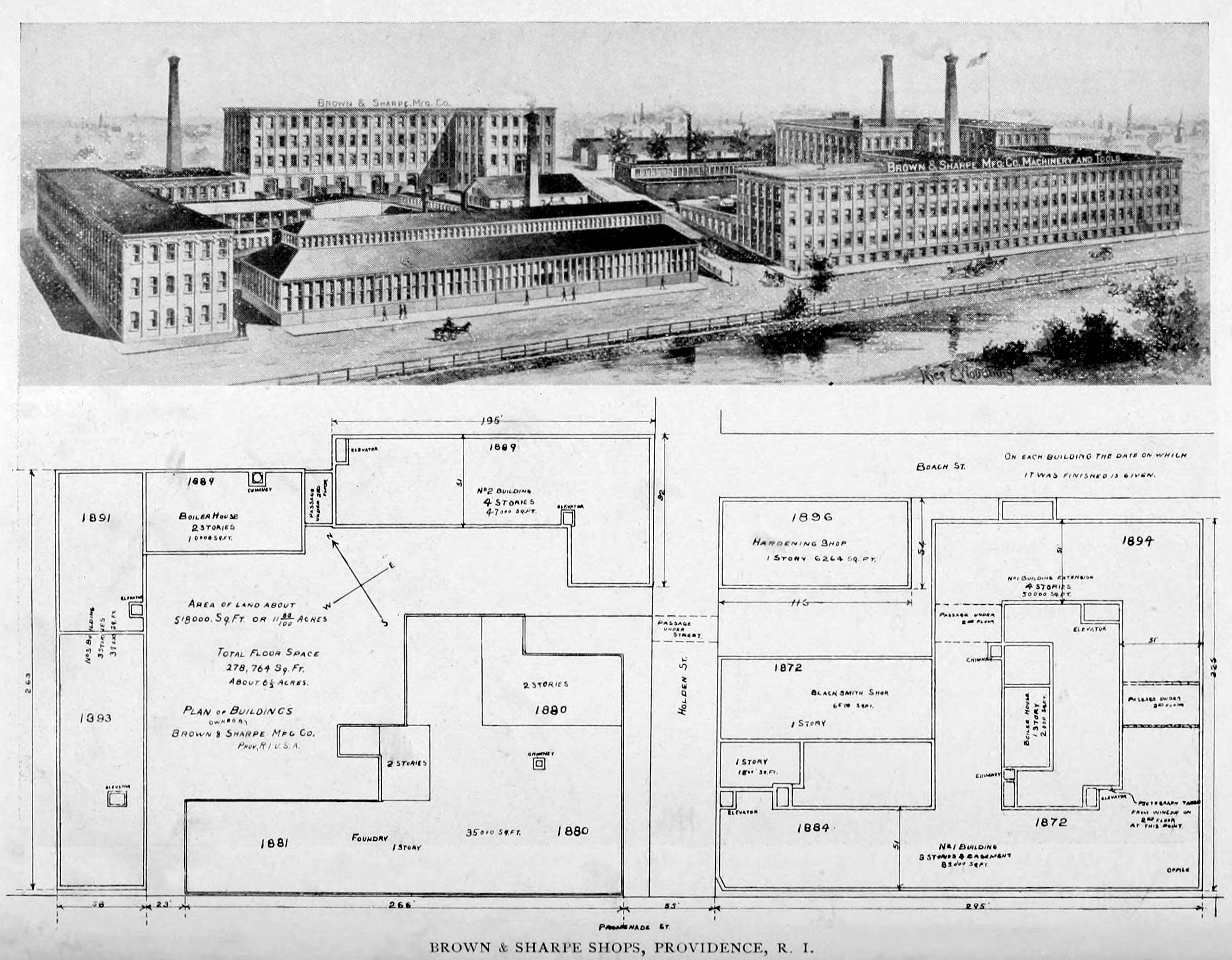
Browns & Sharpe Shops, Providence RI, 1896

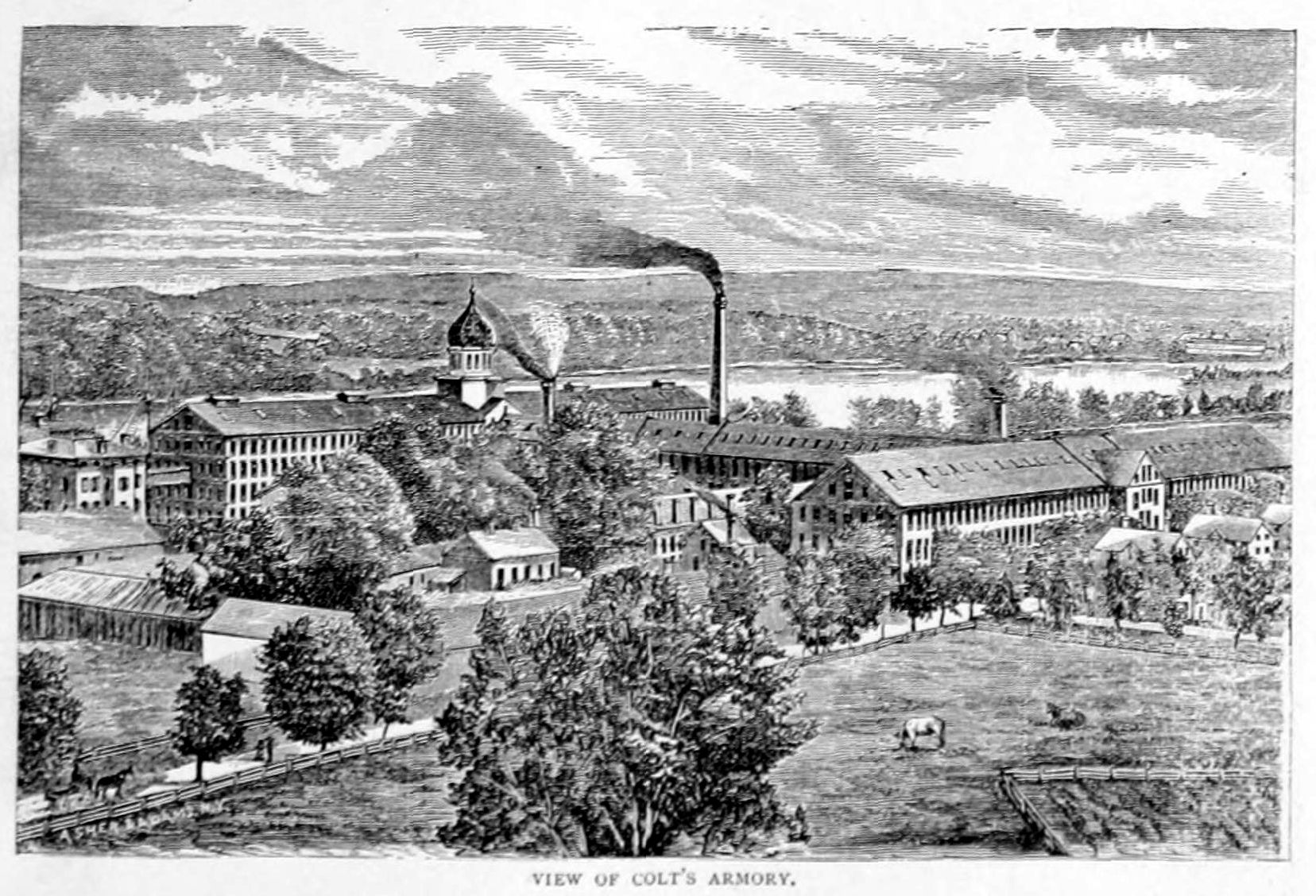
Colt Armory, 1896

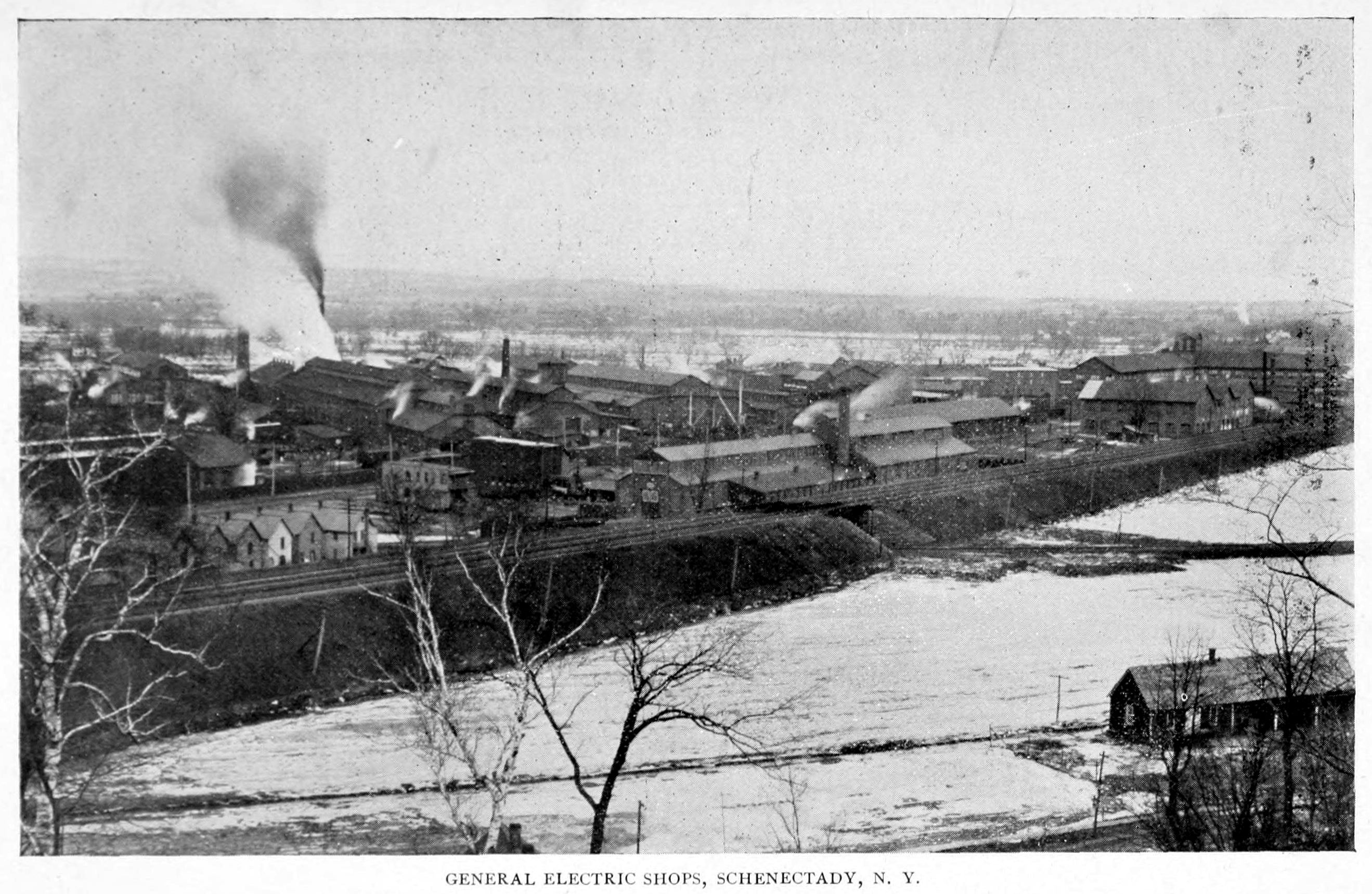
General Electric Shops, Schenectady, NY, aerial view, 1896

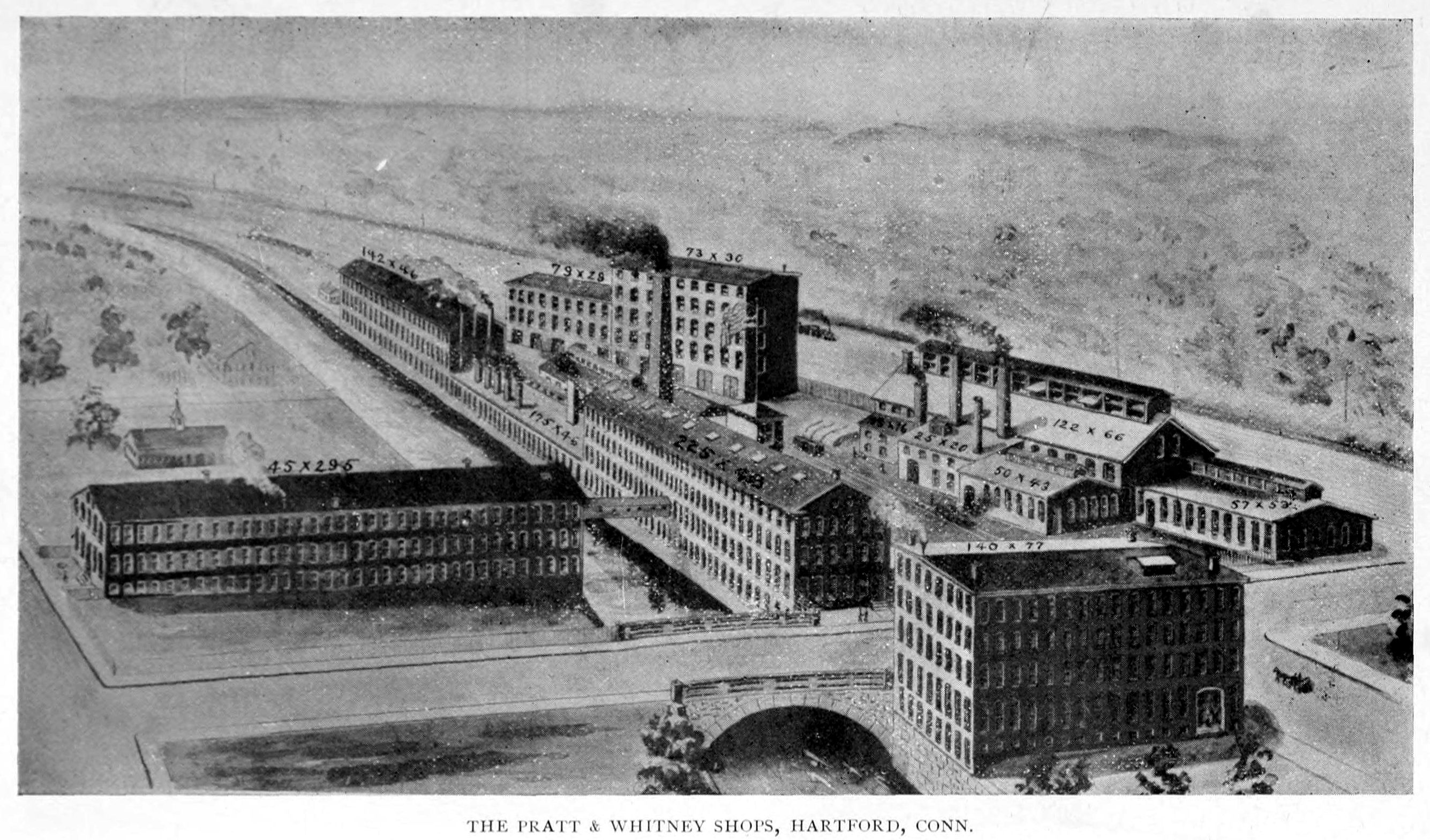
Pratt & Whitney Shops, Hartford, Conn, 1896

In the next years a few more series of articles on these topic would follow in the Engineering Magazine .

=== Six examples of successful shop management, 1897 ===
In 1897 Arnold published a second series, entitled "Six examples of successful shop management." Burton (1899) summarized, that these papers "giving six examples of successful shop management, wherein the influence of fair and just dealing, of isolation and environment, and of careful detailed supervision and definite contracts, upon the prosperity of the factories and the contentment of the work people are cleverly traced. The success is, however, in most cases, that of isolated works under the dominance of exceptionally skilful managers, who impress their own rectitude and personality on the establishment, rather than of any system which recommends itself for general adoption."

The first article recounted about the Whitin Machine Shop in Whitinsville in Northbridge, Massachusetts (see images), at its peak the largest manufacturer of textile machines in the world. And the second article was about the Yale & Towne Manufacturing Co (see images), where Henry R. Towne was president at that time. In those days the company faced serious labour problems, and Towne introduced a series of "measures. He ended the contract system, introduced piece rates, which he guaranteed for one year, and established systematic procedures for dealing with grievances. On new work Towne set minimum and maximum earnings levels so that piece rates, if incorrect, would not unduly punish or reward workers...."

Six examples of successful shop management, 1897
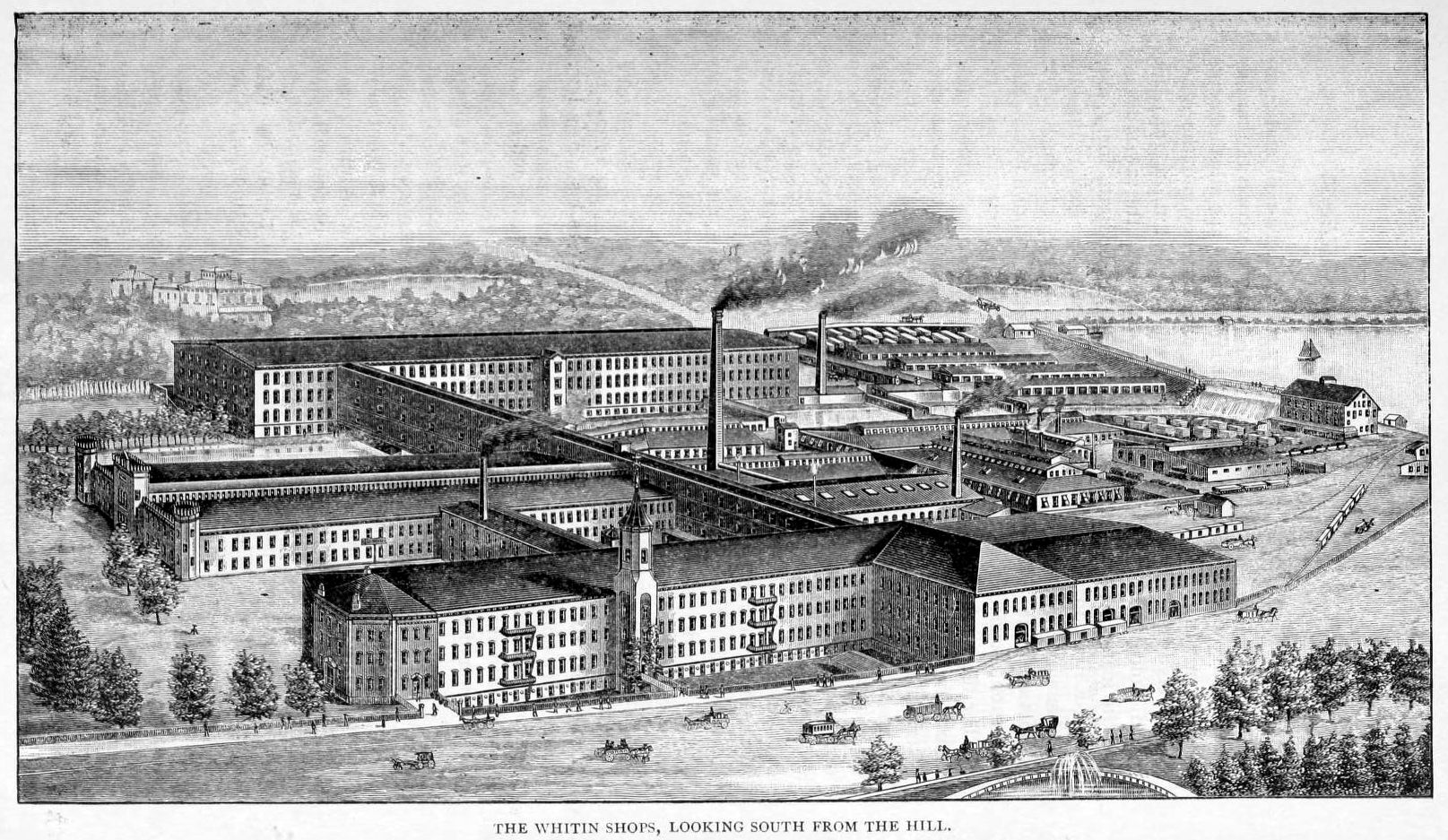
Whitin Machine Shop, 1897

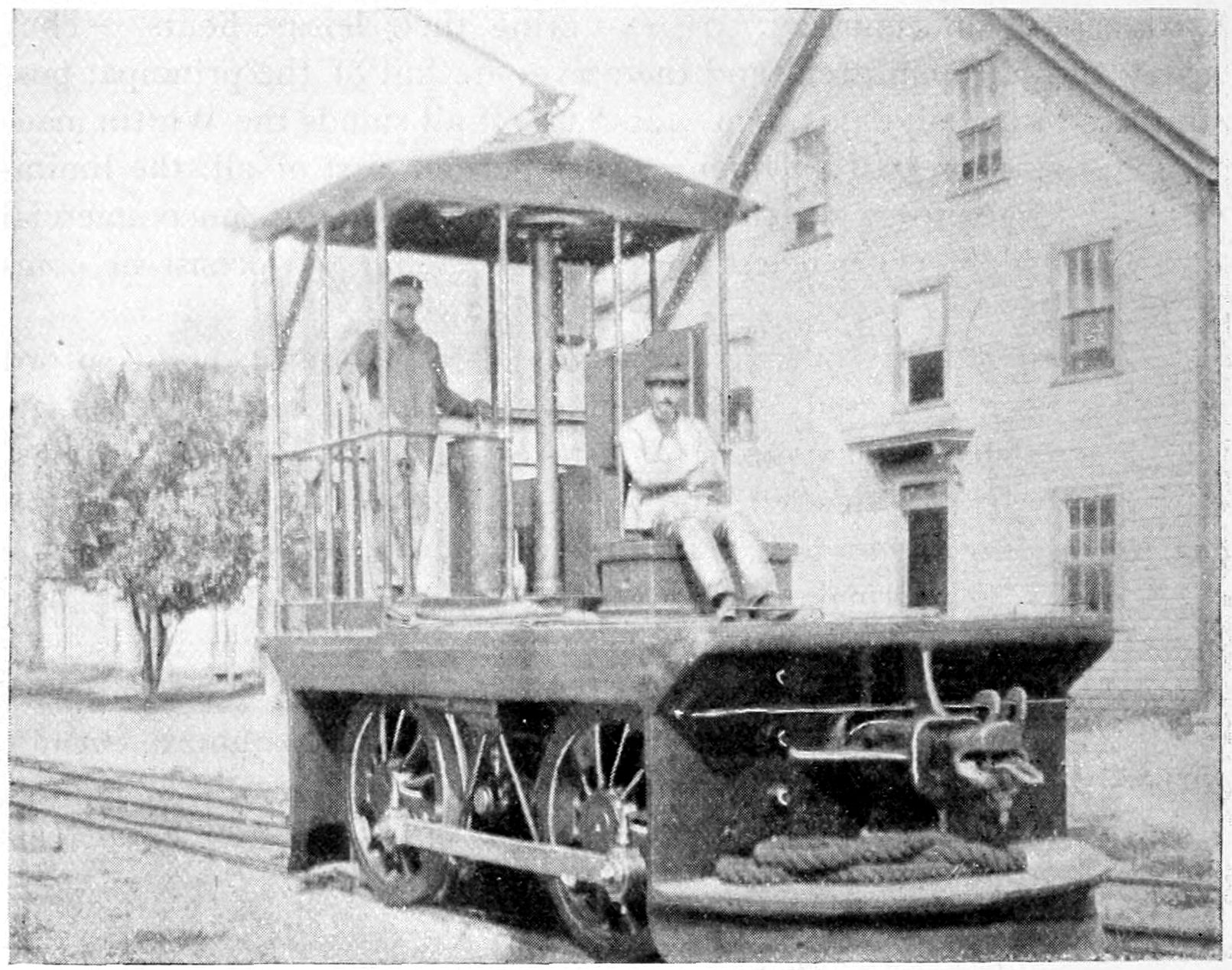
Electric locomotive at Whitin Thomson-Houston, 1897

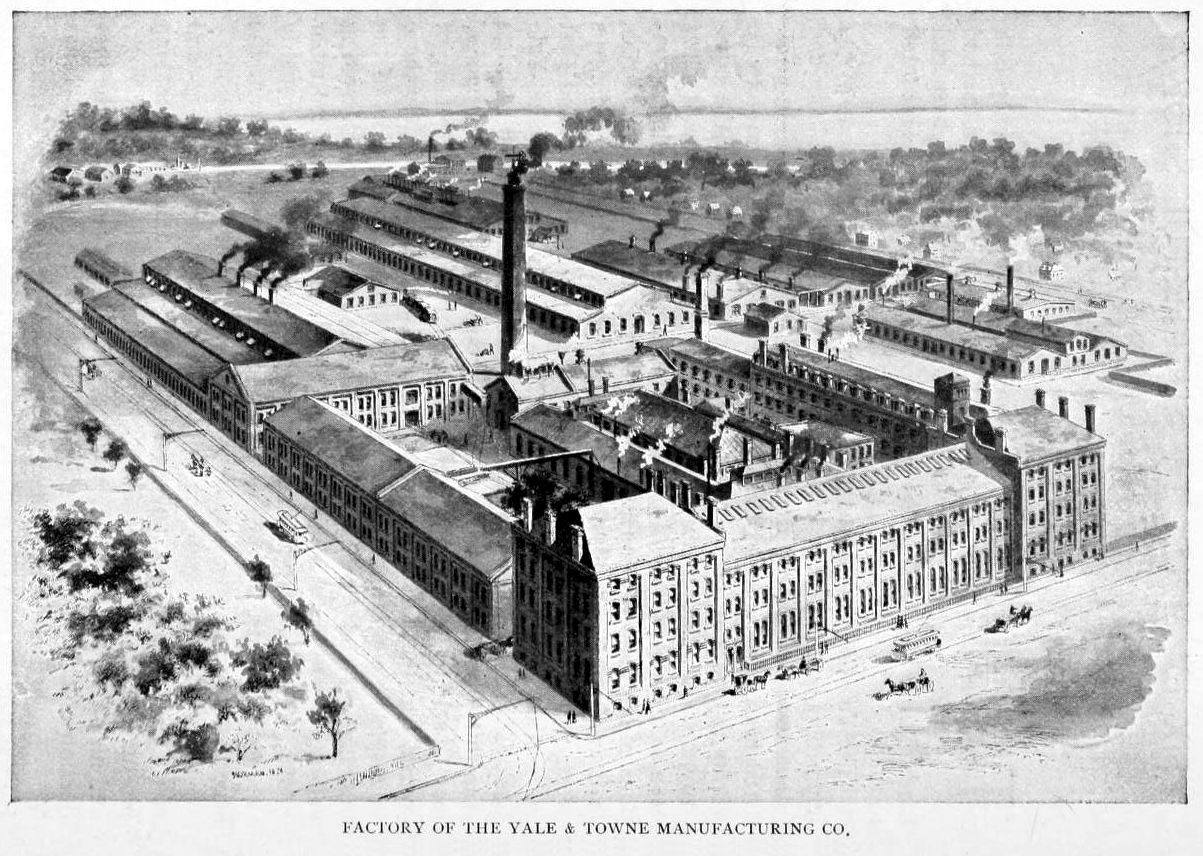
Yale & Towne Manufacturing Co, 1897

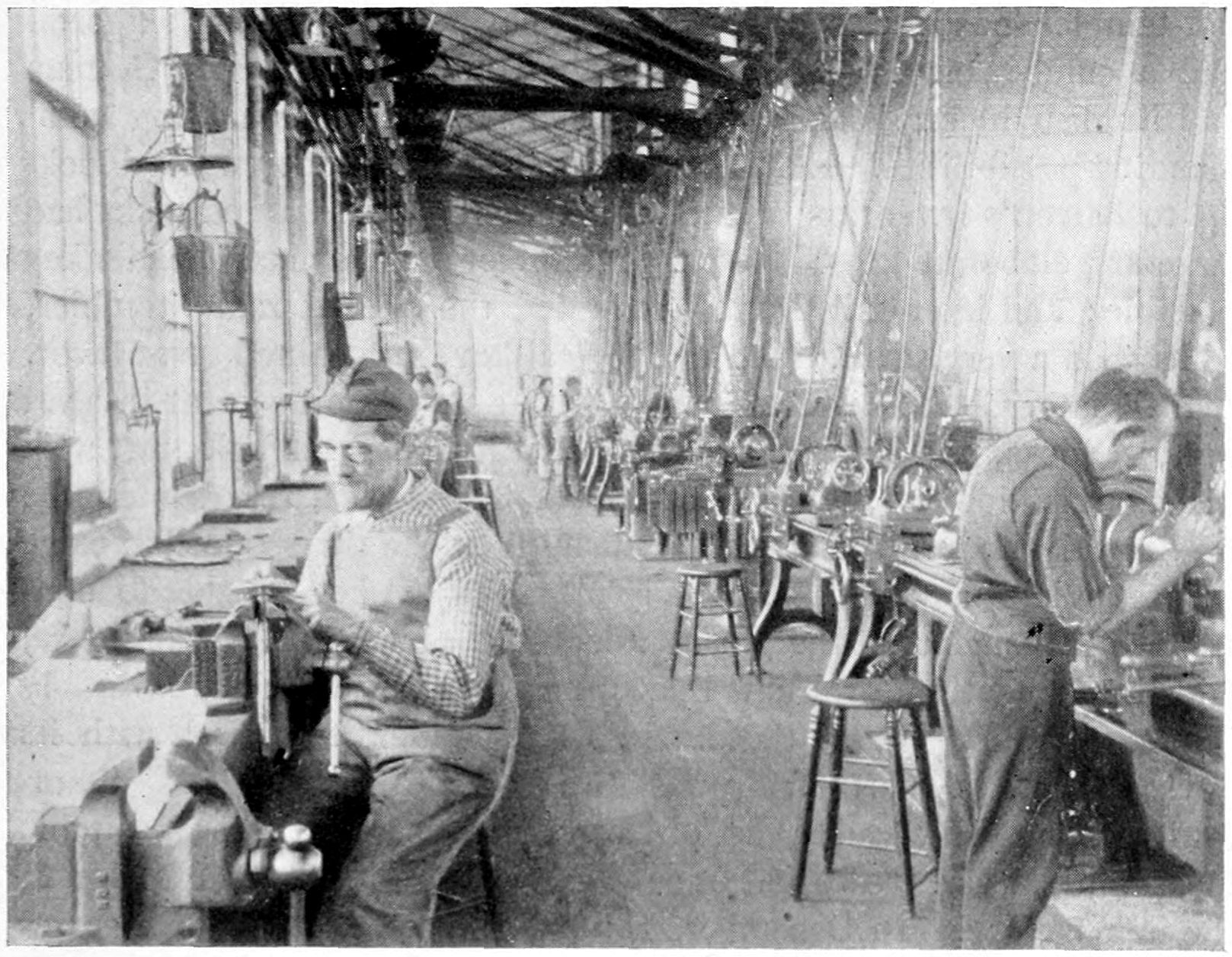
Tool room at the Yale & Towne Manufactoring Co, 1897

In the fourth article, entitled "Pre-Eminent Success of the Differential Piece Rate System", Arnold described the Taylor System as worked out by the Midvale Steel Company. Especially the operation of the piece-rate system at Midvale Steel was described, and the analytic method of rate-fixing deveped by Frederick Winslow Taylor. In those days the rates in the piecework system were set by the supervisor. Burton commented, that this paper contained contains some pregnant remarks on the increase of output through the stimulus of unfettered piecework rates, and is deserving of the most grave consideration by English managers and workmen... The justice and economy of piece-work, even under fixed and absolute rates, is admirably expressed." As Arnold stated:

Not only does the fast man do more work, but that work is done at a reduced fixed-charges cost, and the intelligent manager discovers that he must greatly increase the pay of the speedy man or decrease the pay of the slow man to make each equally profitable. Under these conditions the piece-rate at once suggests itself as a remedy. The piece-rate stimulates the slow artisan, and justly rewards the quick worker, tends to increase the area output, and lessen the fixed-charges drawback on profits.

On the whole series Kaufman (2008) commented, that "a distinctive feature of the six examples of successful shop management highlighted by [Arnold] is that they practiced a relatively benevolent and light-handed form of autocracy in which the golden rule of fair dealing and 'doing unto others' was a guiding management principle. This form of enlightened autocracy was frequently labeled 'industrial paternalism' with the idea that the company was a family, the employer played the role of the benevolent but exacting father (the paternal figure), and the employees were akin to teenage children who, with suitable guidance and discipline, would work together to produce what the family required (as on a family farm)."

=== Effective systems of finding and keeping shop costs, 1898 ===
In 1897-98 Arnold published a first series about cost keeping in machine shops, entitled "Cost-Keeping Methods in Machine-Shop and Foundry," and in 1898 he published a second series of six articles, entitled "Effective systems of finding and keeping shop costs."

This work contributed to the wider discussion among British and American engineers about the development of a costing system for factories. Initial contributions were made by Metcalfe (1885/86), Garcke (1887), Towne (1889), Halsey (1891), etc., and further contributions came from Bunnell, Church, Diemer, Gantt, Randolph, Oberlin Smith, Taylor, among others.

These discussion focussed on topics such as "costing methods, estimating, overhead allocations, economies of scale and other topics normally associated with the accounting." Wells (1996) stated, that these early pioneers in the field of cost accounting, became aware of the "arbitrary nature of cost allocations... [proceeding] accountants by 50 years or more." In that respect, Arnold considered these costs 'probable', yet considered the information from the system 'absolute correct.' Randolph and Diemer (1903) would speak of 'accurate costs' and 'correct' or 'accurate' information. Wells added that these "engineers (as did the accountants who followed them) failed to recognize the difference between a system that allocated all of the overhead costs "accurately"—there were no residual costs unallocated—and the arbitrary cost of production that resulted from the use of some broad allocation base such as direct wages."

=== Written records in business ===
Arnold was known as promoter of written records in business. Arnold (1901) was convinced, that "Even if entire honesty and sincerity prevailed at all times in all business transactions, the mere differences due to variations in individual understandings of orders would render it impossible to conduct any business of magnitude on verbal specifications."

=== Ford Methods and the Ford Shops, 1915 ===
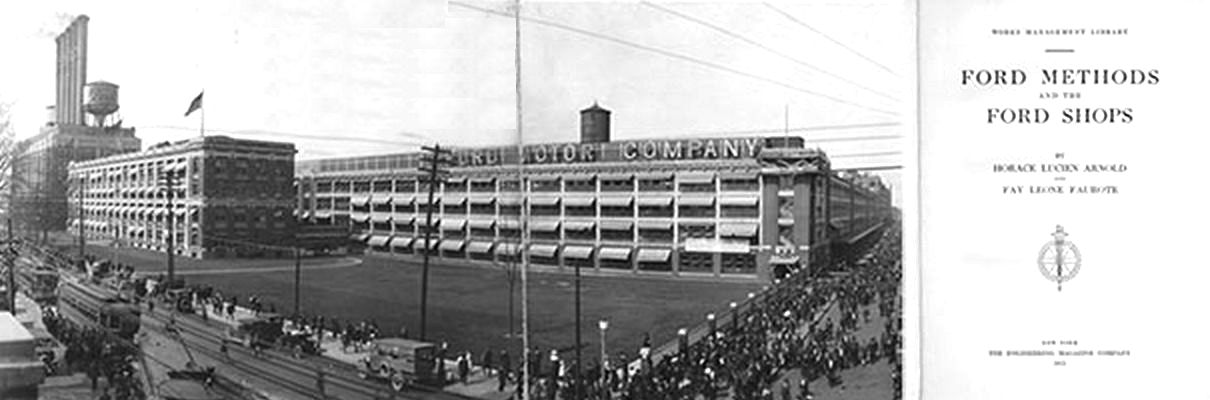
Ford Methods and the Ford Shops, title plate and title page, 1915

Under the penname Hugh Dolnar, Arnold also wrote for the leading automotive magazine Automobile Trade Journal, where he was one of the most respected reporters.

Henry Ford admired his work and early 1910s invited him to study his factory and write about the new production techniques at the Highland Park Ford Plant. This resulted in the book Ford Methods and the Ford Shops, which he left unfinished after his death in 1915.

The engineer Fay Leone Faurote (1881-1938) finished his work, which was published in 1915 by the Engineering Magazine company, and became Arnold's best known work. This book introduced the moving assembly line to the larger audience, explained about its slow progress, and suggested that this system could be applied in any small machine factory.

== Reception ==
A short obituary in the Cycle and Automobile Trade Journal (1915) wrote:

"Those readers who have been with us for five or more years are familiar with "Hugh Dolnar" which was the pen name adopted by Horace L. Arnold. For years "Hugh Dolnar" wrote car descriptions and special automobile engineering articles for the Automobile Trade Journal. His work was by far the most thorough and valuable published during the formative period of the greater automobile industry, and had a style and snap to it which has never been equaled by any other technical writer on automobile construction."

His last work for the Automobile Trade Journal had been on the Ford Factory, the 50-page longe article "The Ford Achievement", published in April, 1914.

== Publications ==
Arnold wrote some books, and many articles on shop management, cost accounting, and other specific management techniques. His books:

- Arnold, Horace L. The Complete cost-keeper; some original systems of shop cost-keeping or factory accounting, together with an exposition of the advantages of account keeping by means of cards instead of books, and a description of various mechanical aids to factory accounting. The Engineering Magazine Press. 1900/1903
- Arnold, Horace L. 1903. The Factory manager and accountant, some examples of the latest American factory practice; collected and arranged by Horace Lucian Arnold (Henry Roland). The Engineering Magazine company. 1903; 2nd ed. 1905; 3rd ed. 1910.
- Arnold, Horace L. Ford Methods and the Ford Shops. With Fay Leone Faurote and preface by Charles Buxton Going. The Engineering Magazine company, 1915.

Articles, a selection

- Arnold, Horace L. "Production Up to the Power Limit." Engineering Magazine 9 (1895): 916–24.
- Arnold, Horace L. "Modern Machine-Shop Economics." in Engineering Magazine 11. 1896
- Hugh Dolnar [Horace L. Arnold], "Bicycle Brazing," American Machinist, 19 November 1896, 1077–81.
- Hugh Dolnar, "The New York Electric Hansom Cabs," American Machinist, XX (July 8, 1897)
- Roland, Henry. "Six examples of successful shop management." Engineering Magazine 12. 1897
- Roland, Henry. "Cost-Keeping Methods in Machine-Shop and Foundry." Engineering Magazine 14, 1897–98
- Roland, Henry. "Effective systems of finding and keeping shop costs." Engineering Magazine 15–16, 1898.
- Roland, Henry. "The revolution in machine-shop practice," The Engineering Magazine 18 (1899)
- Henry Roland, "The Geometrical Generation of Irregular Surfaces in Machine Construction," Engineering Magazine 19 (1900): 83-97
- Arnold, H.L. "The expense account of the machine shop," The Engineering Magazine. 20 (1900). p. 365-72
- Hugh Dolnar, "The Ford 4-Cylinder Runabout," Cycle and Automobile Trade Journal 11 (August 1, 1906): 108
- Hugh Dolnar, Automobile Trade Journal, article: The Lambert, 1906 Line of Automobiles, Chilton Company, v.10 January 1906
- H.L. Arnold. "Ford Methods And The Ford Shops I" in: The Engineering Magazine, April 1914, pp. 1–26
- H.L. Arnold. "Ford Methods And The Ford Shops II" in: The Engineering Magazine, May 1914, pp. 1–26
- H.L. Arnold. "Ford Methods And The Ford Shops III" in: The Engineering Magazine, June 1914, pp. 331–358
- H.L. Arnold. "Ford Methods And The Ford Shops IV" in: The Engineering Magazine, July 1914, pp. 507–532
- H.L. Arnold, "Ford Methods And The Ford Shops V" in Engineering Magazine, 47, August 1914, p. 667-692.
- H.L. Arnold, "Ford Methods And The Ford Shops VI" in Engineering Magazine, 47, August 1914, p. 667-692.
- H.L. Arnold, "Ford Methods And The Ford Shops VII" in Engineering Magazine, 47, September 1914, p. 856-886.
- Hugh Dolnar, "The Ford Achievement," Automobile Trade Journal, v. 18 (Apr.-June 1914). p. 115-165

== Patents ==
About 25 of Arnold's inventions got patented. A selection:

- 1861, Patent US 33229, for an improvement in machines for dressing hides.
- 1887, Patent US 410629 for a type writer machine.
- 1891, Patent US 449595 for a book binder machine.
- 1896, Patent US 572350 for a type writing machine.
- 1899, US 637495 for a milling-cutter tooth.
- 1900, Patent US 661479 for a clutch.
- 1901, Patent US 666840 for a fluid-actuated motor.
- 1912, Patents US 1024817 for a crane shaft.
