= John R. Dunlap =

American journalist, editor and publisher

John Robertson Dunlap (April 11, 1857 – June 5, 1937) was an American journalist, editor and publisher of engineering magazines and books. He is known as founder of the Engineering Magazine in 1891, which in the early 20th century became the "quality magazine in the field of business management."

== Biography ==
Born in Lexington, Kentucky to Henry Clay and La Belle Boyce Dunlap, Dunlap attended Linsly School in Wheeling, West Virginia. He started working in civil engineering at the age of 18 in 1873.

Dunlap came into prominence as president and general manager of the Daily Louisville Commercial in 1884, a journal published in Louisville, Kentucky from 1869 to 1902. In 1889 he moved to New York City, where he started his first magazine The India Rubber World, nowadays The India Rubber World and Electrical Trades Review, or shortly Rubber World. He also founded the magazine Hardware in 1890, The Engineering Magazine in 1891, and The Engineering Index in 1895. The Engineering Magazine was renamed Industrial Management in 1916, and in 1917 the American Society of Mechanical Engineers acquired the Engineering Index. In 1921 Dunlap started his last great project the Industry Illustrated magazine.

In 1891 Dunlap had founded the Engineering Magazine Company in New York, and became its chairman of the board. Around 1917 this company merged into the McGraw-Hill Publishing Company, Inc. The Engineering Magazine Co also published over 40 books on industrial management issues, most noted the "Ford Methods and Ford Shops" by Horace L. Arnold and Fay L. Fauroto, which offered the first full description of Henry Ford's work.

== Selected publications ==
- Dunlap, John R. et al. (eds.). Engineering Magazine. New York, The Engineering Magazine Co., 1891–1916
- Dunlap, John R. et al. (eds.). Industrial management; the engineering magazine. New York, The Engineering Magazine Co., 1916–1927
- Dunlap, John R., Arthur Van Vlissingen, and John M. Carmody (eds.). Factory and industrial management, New York, The Engineering Magazine Co., 1928–1929
