= Charles Buxton Going =

American engineer

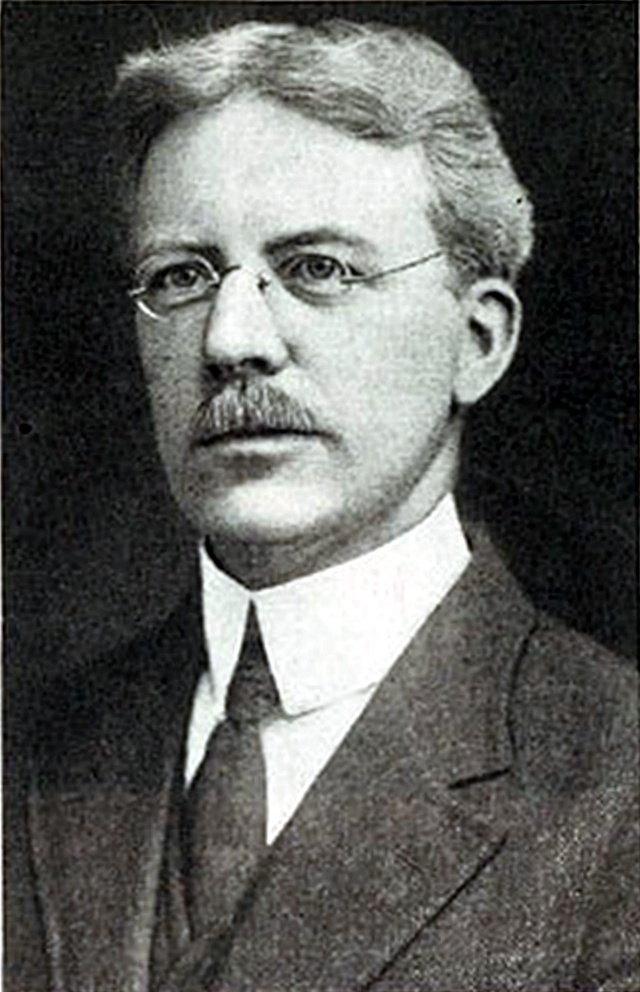
Charles Buxton Going, 1911.

Charles Buxton Going (April 4, 1863 - 1952 in France) was an American engineer, writer, and editor.

== Biography ==
Born in Westchester N.Y., Going attended Columbia College School of Mines, where he graduated in 1882. Columbia University awarded him the honorary degree of M.Sc. in 1910.

Mr. Going immediately began work in the Middle West in industrial and corporate management. He joined the staff of the Engineering Magazine in 1896, becoming managing editor in 1898 and editor in 1912. He did much to discern, define, and establish the profession of "industrial engineering."

He became special lecturer on the subject of "industrial engineering" at Columbia, Harvard University, New York University, and the University of Chicago.

== Publications ==
His writings include:

- 1909. Methods of the Santa Fé
- 1911. Principles of Industrial Engineering
- 1915. Preface to Ford methods and the Ford shops. Horace Lucian Arnold and Fay Leone Faurote. The Engineering magazine company, 1915.

On less scholarly notes, he wrote:

- Summer-Fallow (1892)
- Star-Glow and Song (1909)
- Folklore and Fairy Plays (1927)

In collaboration with Marie Overton Corbin (later Mrs. Going, d. May 1925), he wrote:

- Urchins of the Sea (1900)
- Urchins of the Pole (1901)

== Legacy ==
- American composer Gertrude Martin Rohrer (1875-1968) used Going’s text for her composition “The Sleepy Song.”
