= John M. Carmody =

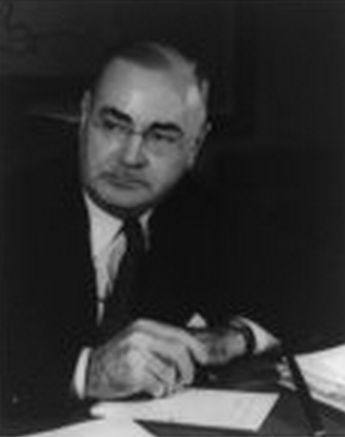

Member of the National Labor Relations Board
- In office August 27, 1935 – August 31, 1936
- Preceded by: office established
- Succeeded by: Donald Wakefield Smith

Personal details
- Born: November 1, 1881; Towanda, Pennsylvania, U.S. (Note: Carmody's draft registration card of April 1942 listed his place of birth as "Greenwood Twp., Bradford Co., Pa.")
- Died: November 11, 1963 (aged 82); Washington, D.C.
- Political party: Democratic
- Education: Elmira College; Illinois Institute of Technology; Columbia University

John Michael Carmody (November 1, 1881 – November 11, 1963) was an American administrator, noted as editor of Factory and Industrial Management, and as administrator of the Rural Electrification Administration and the Federal Works Agency in the 1930s.

== Biography ==
Born in Towanda, Pennsylvania, Carmody attended Elmira College, the Lewis Institute in Chicago (later merged with Armour Institute of Technology to become Illinois Institute of Technology), and the Columbia University.

In 1900, Carmody started his career in the steel industry, working as inspector for companies in Pennsylvania and Illinois, and abroad in Ontario in Canada, and in Havana in Cuba. From 1914 to 1922, he worked in the garment industry in Cleveland, Ohio for the H. Black Company, producer of produced WoolTex brand coats for women, and for the Printz-Biederman Company, another coat manufacturer. In 1921, he joined the Bituminous Coal Commission under US President Warren G. Harding, his first federal job. The work of the commission would eventually lead to the Guffey Coal Act of 1935. From 1922 to 1926, Carmody worked for the Davis's Davis Coal and Coke Company in Coketon, West Virginia.

In 1927, Carmody joined the McGraw-Hill Publishing company to become editor for the magazine Coal Age, and from 1928 to 1929 for the Factory and Industrial Management magazine. From 1933 he held several government positions, starting as appointed chief engineer of the Civil Works Administration in 1933, member of the National Mediation Board in 1934/35, and in the National Labor Relations Board in 1935. In 1937, he was appointed by Franklin D. Roosevelt administrator of Rural Electrification Administration, and in 1939 head of the Federal Works Agency (FWA).

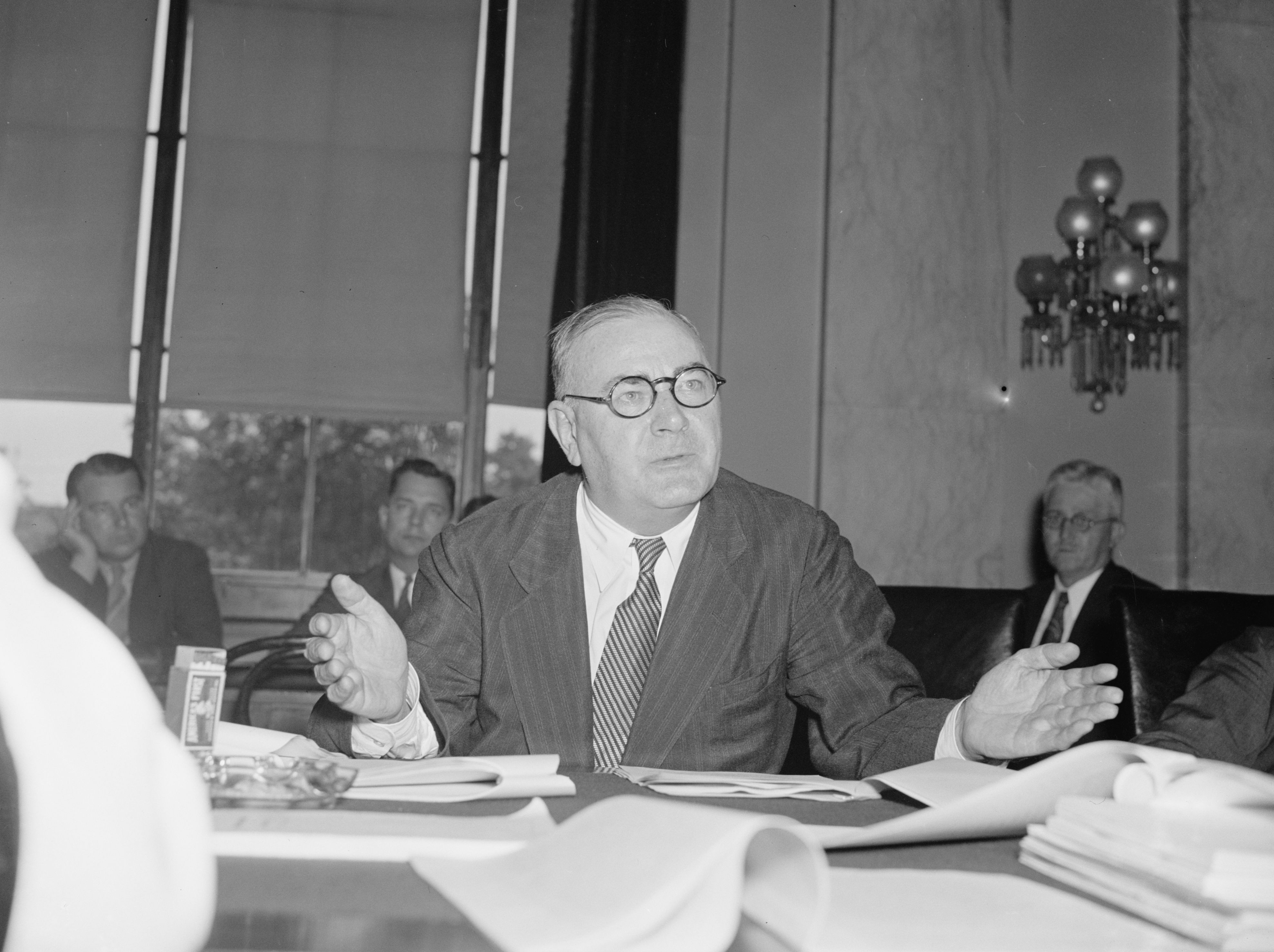
Carmody before a Senate committee on July 13, 1939

As administrator of the FWA, Carmody appeared before a Senate committee on July 13, 1939, where he promised to the "Senate Banking and Currency Committee that the new $350,000,000 public works program would not interfere with private industry. He pointed out that President Roosevelt's program made no specific provisions for federal loans to municipalities for acquisition of private utilities."

Carmody was also member of the United States Maritime Commission (1941–1946), the War Assets Administration until 1949, and the General Board of the United States Navy until 1951. In the 1950s, he continued to work as a consultant and labor arbitrator.

Carmody died in 1963 at the age of 82, due to complications from a broken hip. He was predeceased by his wife and survived by a daughter.

== Selected publications ==
- Dunlap, John R., Arthur Van Vlissingen and John Michael Carmody (eds.). Factory and Industrial Management, New York, The Engineering Magazine Co., 1928-1929
- John M. Carmody, E. W. Clark. Wage Rate Laws on Public Works.. U.S. Government Printing Office, 1939.
- Carmody, John Michael. The Reminiscences of John Carmody. Columbia University, Oral History Research Office, 1957.

Articles, a selection:

- John M. Carmody “Unemployment Solutions,” Factory and Industrial Management, LXXIX (June, 1930), 371
- Carmody, John M. "Rural Electrification in the United States." The Annals of the American Academy of Political and Social Science (1939): 82–88.
