= Arthur Van Vlissingen =

Arthur Van Vlissingen Jr. (November 22, 1894 – October 20, 1986) was an American writer and bureau chief for Business Week and Newsweek, noted as editor of the Factory and Industrial Management journal.

== Life and work ==
Van Vlissingen was born in Chicago to Arthur H. Van Vlissingen, who was a prominent developer and commercial real estate broker in Chicago. After obtaining an engineering degree at the Northwestern University, and joined the US Navy to serve in World War I.

After graduation he joined the McGraw-Hill Publishing company as Assistant editor and later editor for the Factory and Industrial Management journal. He continued to edited the magazine in the 1930s when it was renamed Factory Management and Maintenance. In 1927 Van Vlissingen published "The Yankee of the Yards: The Biography of Gustavus Franklin Swift," co-authored with Louis Franklin Swift. This work provides a history of Chicago's meat packing industry from the viewpoint of the son of the founder of the largest packing company in the world.

In the 1930s he joined Business Week, where he became bureau chief in the Midwest. He later joined Newsweek, where he headed its bureau. In the 1960s he co-authored some more works on the history of postal offices in the 19th century.

== Selected publications ==
- Dunlap, John R., Arthur Van Vlissingen and John Michael Carmody (eds.). Factory and industrial management, New York, The Engineering Magazine Co., 1928-1929
- Swift, Louis Franklin, Arthur Van Vlissingen. Yankee of the Yards: The Biography of Gustavus Franklin Swift. A.W. Shaw and Company, Chicago, Illinois . (1927).
- Richow, Harold E., Ray Van Handel, and Arthur Van Vlissingen. The Territorial Post Offices of Wisconsin: Their Covers and Postmarks, July 4, 1836-May 29, 1848: Including Those which Were in the Michigan Territory, October 6, 1821-July 3, 1836. Wisconsin Postal History Society, 1963.
- Van Vlissingen, Arthur, and Morrison Waud. New York Foreign Mail Cancellations, 1870-1876. Collectors Club of Chicago, 1968.

Articles, a selection:

- Van Vlissingen, Arthur. "The BIG Idea behind Those SMALL Plants of Ford's." Factory Management and Maintenance 96: 46.
- Arthur Van Vlissingen, Jr., "Fred Harvey," Factory and Industrial Management 78 (Nov. 1929): 1085. 34.
