= Frederick Remsen Hutton =

American engineer (1853–1918)

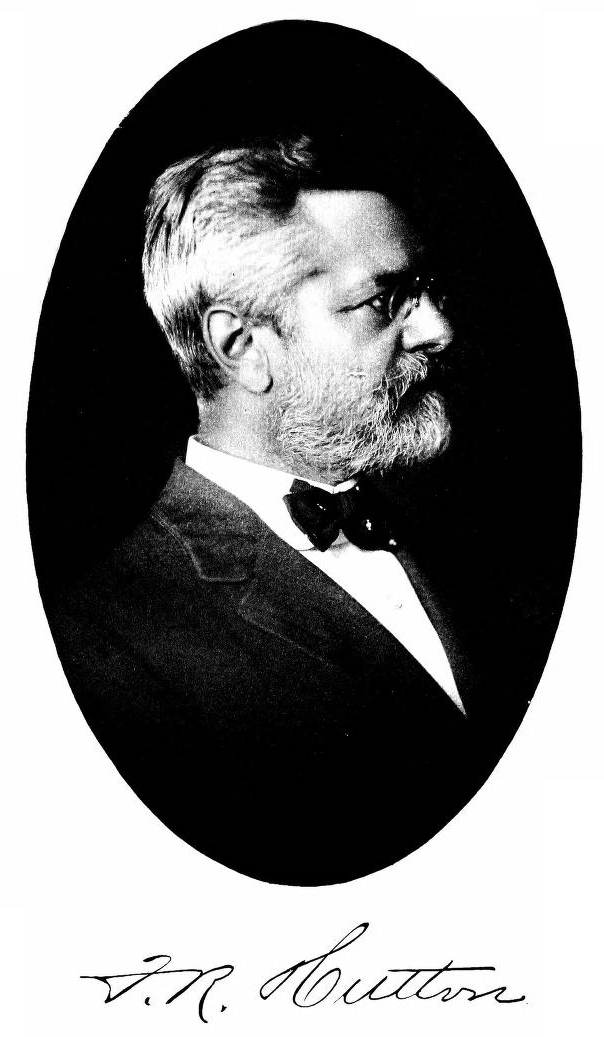
Frederick Remsen Hutton (1853–1918)

Frederick Remsen Hutton, M.E., Sc.D. (1853 – New York City May 14, 1918) was an American mechanical engineer, consulting engineer, educator, editor of the Engineering Magazine and president of the American Society of Mechanical Engineers in the year 1907–08.

== Biography ==
Hutton was born in New York City, graduated from Columbia College in 1873, and from Columbia School of Mines in 1876. He was employed there in several positions until he retired in 1907. Columbia gave him the honorary degree of Sc.D. in 1904.

In 1892 he became associate editor of the Engineering Magazine. From 1883 to 1906 he was secretary of the American Society of Mechanical Engineers; and he became president of the organization in 1907. In 1911 he was consulting engineer for the department of water, gas, and electricity of New York City, and he served as chairman of the technical committee of the Automobile Club of America for many terms. He wrote reports on machine tools for the census of 1880 and multiple books.

Sinclair and Hull (1980) reflected, that "Frederick Hutton was eager to have the Society also determine a standard for rating steam-boiler capability, and observed 'it is part of our duty, no doubt, to establish gauges and standards.'33 In the drive to rationalize American industry that began to gather force in the last quarter of the nineteenth century, standardization was to the engineer what administration was to the manager. Within the technologically complex mechanical industries, especially, the creation of standard parts and uniform practices gave the engineer control over anomaly."

== Publications, a selection ==
- Frederick Remsen Hutton, Mechanical Engineering of Power Plants (1897; third edition, 1909);
- Frederick Remsen Hutton, Heat and Heat Engines (1899);
- Frederick Remsen Hutton, The Gas-Engine (1903; third edition, 1908).
- Frederick Remsen Hutton, A history of the American Society of Mechanical Engineers from 1880 to 1915, 1915
