= Engineering Magazine =

American illustrated monthly magazine

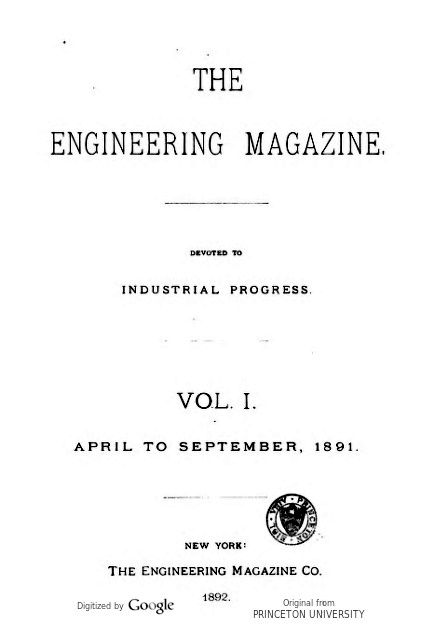
- Editor: John R. Dunlap, Arthur Van Vlissingen, John M. Carmody
- Categories: Engineering and Industrial Management
- Frequency: 12/year
- Publisher: Engineering Magazine Co.
- First issue: 1891
- Final issue: 1916

Engineering Magazine was an American illustrated monthly magazine devoted to industrial progress, first published in 1891. The periodical was published under this title until October 1916. Sequentially from Nov. 1916 to 1927 it was published as Industrial Management.

Engineering Magazine was a popular journal about engineering, technology, and industry. It described the system of manufacturing which has come to be known as distinctively American. Several leading authors of the efficiency movement published the first versions of their seminal works in the Engineering Magazine.

With Frederick W. Taylor named the father of scientific management, the Engineering Magazine has been called "the mother of the entire management movement."

== History ==
=== First edition in 1891 ===
The Engineering Magazine started as an illustrated monthly magazine devoted to industrial progress, with its first number published in April 1891. An 1891 review explained, that the magazine is devoted to the popular treatment of engineering in all its branches, and is "certainly worthy of support by all who desire to keep pace with industrial development throughout the world."

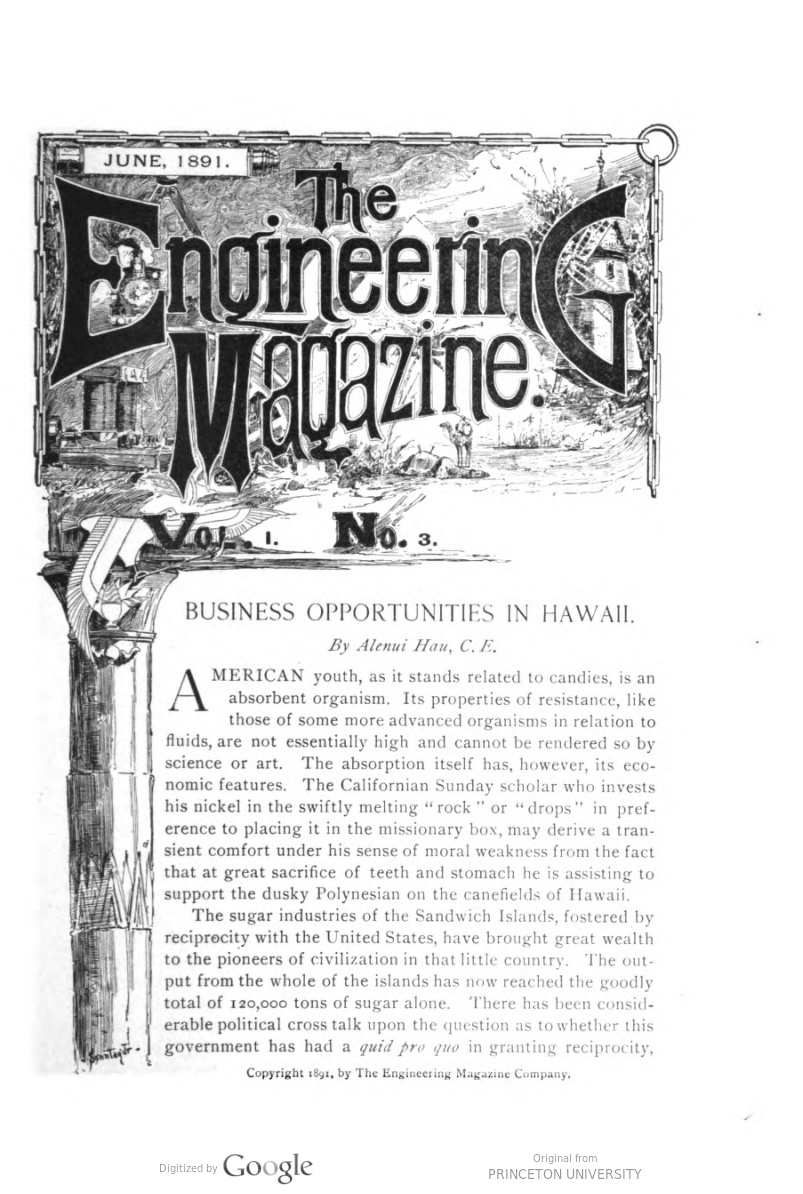
Engineering Magazine Vol 1, No 3, June. 1891

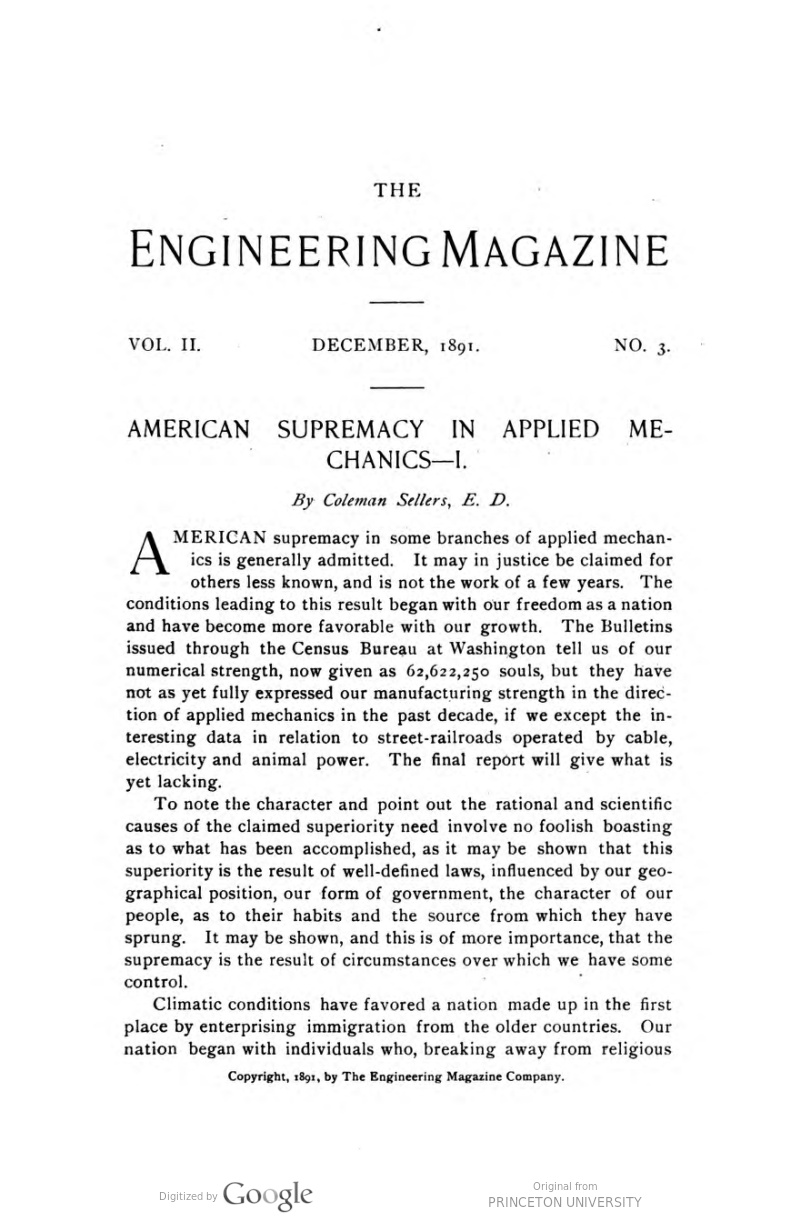
Engineering Magazine Vol 2, No 3, Dec. 1891

In Europe and the United States magazines on engineering had been published for over half a century. Notable magazines since those days were:

- The Engineer, British London-based monthly magazine covering the latest developments and business news in engineering and technology.
- Engineering : British magazine founded in 1865 and published by the Office for Publication and Advertisements which reported on developments and news in many disciplines of engineering in Britain and abroad.
- Der Civilenginieur. Zeitschrift für das Ingenieurwesen : First German engineering magazine, which specialising in mechanics, which ran until 1896. In 1853 Gustav Zeuner had taken over as the editor-in-chief.
- American Machinist, American magazine published by McGraw-Hill from 1877 to 1960.
- Transactions of the American Society of Mechanical Engineers, short ASME Transactions, published by the Society since 1880, and
- Cassier's Engineering Magazine published by The Louis Cassier Co. Ltd. from 1891 to 1913.

Late 19th century more of these journals also focussed the impact of engineering on technology and industry.

The Engineering Magazine (1891) explained that "the magazine is founded upon the idea of treating only the principles involved in engineering problems — which are always simple — to the end that our circle of readers may embrace, in addition to professional men, the thousands of intelligent business men who are interested or actively engaged in the industrial enterprises of our times, but who are without technical training."

Alexander (2008) recalled that the "Engineering Magazine was a witness to the workings of technical efficiency. Directed toward readers who were technically and mathematically trained it encouraged them to base their social contributions on professionalized status, primarily as mechanical engineers but also as physicists, civil engineers, and, increasingly after 1900, as industrial managers and governmental officials. Engineering Magazine came out monthly, each issue compact and dense, sitting heavy in the hand. It was composed of close-copy text, mathematical formulas and statistical charts and tables, alongside drawings and photographs of instruments, machines, and construction sites. Its reach was international and grounded in advanced formal training, its contributors' names often prefaced by the title "Professor." Between 1907 and 1911 several leaders in the Progressive efficiency movement published the first versions of their seminal works in the Engineering Magazine: Harrington Emerson's Twelve Principles of Efficiency appeared in serial form from 1909 to 1911, and the magazine was among the first to publish Gantt's influential efficiency charts."

=== Organization as a system, early 1900 ===
In the first decade the Engineering Magazine made an important contribution to the codification and crystallization of the study of organizations. In 1906 the editors of the Engineering Magazine acknowledge this development:

It is almost exactly ten years since The Engineering Magazine laid down the first clear definitions of that system of manufacturing which has come to be known as distinctively American. During the entire intervening period, these pages have been the repository of the leading literature of the subject — of the classics in the science of engineering as applied to mechanical production. We have numbered among our contributors most of the great specialists in the practice of "Production Engineering" — the modern profession based upon this highly modern literature — and the fundamental principles of systematized specialized, standardized, and repetitive manufacture have been set forth more fully and lucidly here than anywhere else.

The emerging organizational discourse was one on the events of the Progressive Era, the period of social activism and political reform in the United States that flourished from the 1890s to the 1920s. According to Tsoukas & Knudsen (2005) in this period the concept of the organization as a system "assumed coherence and autonomy and became an object of independent inquiry." One of the first to express this concept, was Charles U. Carpenter how stated Engineering Magazine (1902):

In seeking the reason for the lasting and commanding success of American business organizations of today, two facts will stand out prominently. One is that the organizations are founded upon principles that are in accord with modern progressive ideas and that tend to bring out the latent intelligence, loyalty and strength of all its members.
The other is that the important details of factory work are cared for by systems which are homogeneous, flexible and efficient; systems which leave nothing to chance, but which care for the smallest and the most important details of factory work alike.

This was confirmed in those days by the editors of the American Machinist, who noted that "there is not a man, machine, operation or system in the shop that stands entirely alone. Each one, to be valued rightly, must be viewed as part of a whole." American Machinist, 3 March 1904: 294–6; cited in Tsoukas & Knudsen (2005)

=== The study of organizations, 1912 ===
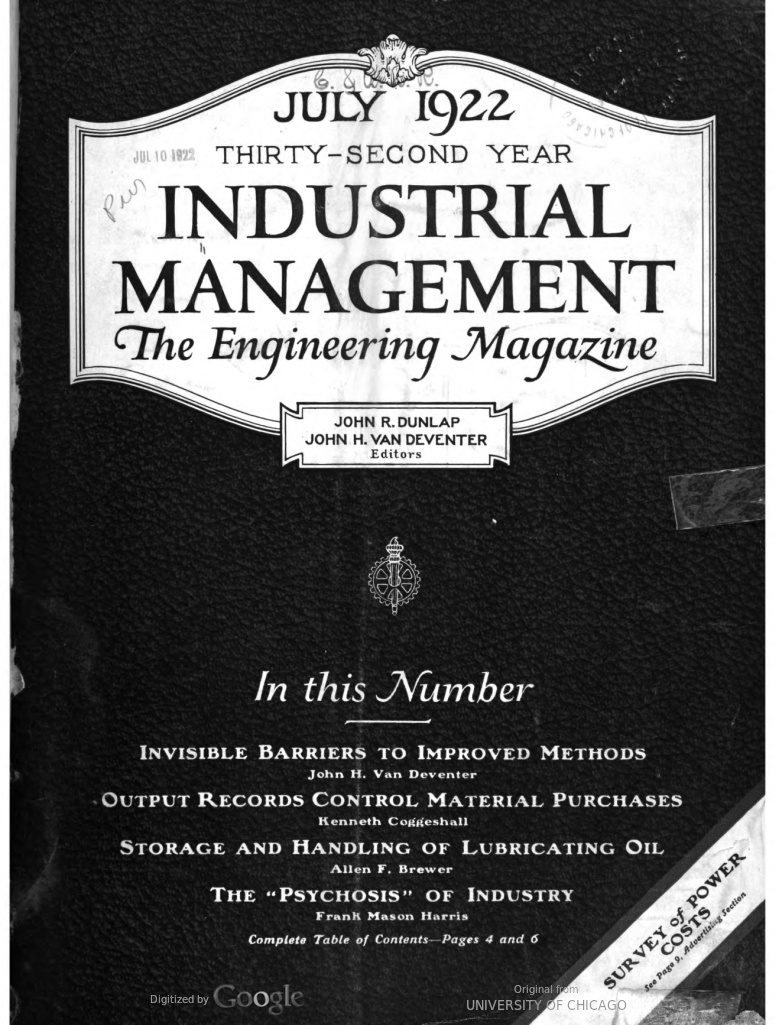
Industrial Management, July 1922

The 1912 article "The unit system on the Harriman Lines" by Charles DeLano Hine (1867–1927) was one of the first to acknowledge the study of organizations as a separate fields of study. Hine wrote, that organization has been termed a smaller sister of sociology, the science of human nature. Industrial organization, including that of transportation and commerce, reflects and typifies in a greater or less degree the sociological development of a people.

=== Further developments ===
The periodical is published under this title until October 1916. Sequentially from Nov. 1916 to 1927 it was published as Industrial Management.

In Jan. 1928 the magazine was absorbed in Factory and Industrial Management, short Factory, which was absorbed in Manufacturing Industries in Mar. 1929, and eventually absorbed in Factory Management and Maintenance, which ran until the early 1950s. It is one last time renamed to Modern Manufacturing.

== Organization ==
Several notable people participated in the organization of the Engineering Magazine:

- John Robertson Dunlap founded the Engineering magazine in 1891 and remained editor until 1927
- Alexander Hamilton Church, late 19th century for a period of seven years European manager for "The Engineering Magazine."

Notable editors

- Arthur Van Vlissingen and John Michael Carmody co-edited with Dunlap the Engineering Magazine in the early days
- Frederick Remsen Hutton, in 1892 he became associate editor of the Engineering Magazine.
- Charles Buxton Going joined the staff of the Engineering Magazine in 1896, becoming managing editor in 1898 and editor in 1912.
- Leon Pratt Alford : In 1907 Alford started working in engineering journalism for the Engineering Magazine company. From 1907 to 1911 he was engineering editor at the American Machinist, and from 1911 to 1917 editor-in-chief. Sequentially he was editor for the Industrial Management from 1917 to 1920, from 1921 to 1923 editor for Manufacturing Industrial Management, and from 1923 to 1928 consulting editor for the Factory and Industrial Management and vice-president of the Ronald Press Company in New York
- Nestor Buinitsky, became a professor. He co-operated with the Engineering Magazine.
- Franklin Leonard Pope, edited the electrical section of the Engineering Magazine.

Authors who published articles in the Engineering Magazine:

- The Engineering Magazine, Vol. 2 (1891) listed Edward Atkinson, Andrew Carnegie, Joseph Kendall Freitag, C.J. Norwood of the Frankford Arsenal, and Albert Williams Jr.
- Yehouda Shenhav (2007) mentioned "Harrington Emerson, Henry Gantt, Alexander Hamilton Church, Charles Bedaux, Chester Barnard, Luther Gulick and Lyndall Urwick, James Mooney and Alan Reiley, Fritz Roethlisberger and William Dickson, or George Terry."

== Other publications by the same publisher ==
French (1914) stated, that the Engineering Magazine Co. has published a number of well-known books on works management. Some notable examples:

- "The Complete Cost Keeper"; by Horace L. Arnold, 1900.
- "The Factory Manager and Accountant"; by Horace L. Arnold, 1903.
- "Graphic methods for presenting facts", by Willard C. Brinton, 1914

The Engineering Magazine Co. in New York also published some important indexes, such as The Engineering index annual.

== Reception ==
A 1966 review in Business Week summarized, that the Engineering Magazine founded by Dunlap in 1891 "had long before become the quality magazine in the field of business management. If Frederick W. Taylor was the father of scientific management, the Engineering Magazine was most certainly the mother of the entire management movement — the family forum for every pioneer in management 20 years before efficiency became a national fad."

Tsoukas & Knudsen (2005) added, that "during the first half of the twentieth century, the rhetoric and practice of organizational systems have traveled from engineering circles to additional fields and became widely known in American industry and academia. In 1916, John Dunlap the editor of Engineering Magazine inaugurated Industrial Management which was devoted to issues of organizational systematization and became a professional outlet for organizational thought.

Yehouda Shenhav (2007) recalled that "the embryonic engineering/management ideas that were published in these magazines were later collected and collated in books... These books were read by sociologists, psychologists, engineers, political scientists, and became the seedbed from which discourse on rational organizations grew."
