= Charles U. Carpenter =

American business manager, management author, and inventor

Charles Underwood Carpenter (Indiana, January 1872 – January 15, 1928) was an American business manager, management author, and inventor, known as "one of the earliest advocates of the committee system in factory management."

== Biography ==
Carpenter got his degree from Princeton University in 1893, and started his career in industry. He came into prominence after being hired by John Henry Patterson, founder of the National Cash Register Company (NCR), in 1901 to reorganize the labor management department of his company. This resulted in the development of the concept of functionalized labour management department, which was set up within NCR. To further promote the idea published the article "The Working of a Labor Department in Industrial Establishments." in the Engineering Magazine in 1903.

At National Cash Register Company (NCR) was put in charge of a workforce of 7.500 man for several years. Around 1905 he left the company and to become President of the Herring-Hall Marvin Safe Company, the largest safe company in the world. Here he wrote the book "Profit Making in Shop and Factory Management," published in 1908.

In the 1910s he joined the Recording and Computing Machines Company, a manufacturer of precision equipment. The Princeton Alumni Weekly in 1918 reported that "Charles U. Carpenter is the Vice-President and Manager of Works, of the Recording and Computing Machines Company of Dayton, Ohio. He has under him 9,000 employees. During the war he gave his big plant over to the manufacture of war supplies. His first job was the production of six million time fuses. He also made many of the optical instruments employed in sighting the guns. An unusual service which he personally rendered the country was the establishment of a training school for mechanics. So important was this work that it has been made the subject of a special bulletin by the Department of Labor, Imperial Munitions Hoard of Canada, and also by the Section on Industrial Training of the Council of National Defence at Washington."

In 1920 Carpenter became president and general manager of the National Industrial Engineering Company, and in those days he was also Vice president of the western Appraisal Company.

== Work ==
Carpenter was promoter of the American system of manufacturing. He claimed. that "one can but admire the wonderful systems of organization and management by which the enormous business interests of the United States are governed."

He firmly believed in firm principles of management, and started that "if the system of organization is founded upon the correct principles, the perfection of the details will follow as a natural sequence."

Carpenter was, however, not blind for the all-day practice. He observed, that "in the mind of the old-time manufacturer the word 'system' is indissolubly linked with that of horror of 'extra clerks'..."

== Selected publications ==
- Carpenter, Charles Underwood. Profit Making in Shop and Factory Management. Engineering Magazine, 1908.
- Carpenter, Charles Underwood. Increasing Production, Decreasing Costs, Engineering Magazine Company, (1920)

Articles, a selection:

- Carpenter, Charles U. "Money-making management for workshop and factory," in: Engineering magazine, New York. Vol. 22 (1902) p. 693-702
- Carpenter, C. U. "The Working of a Labor Department in Industrial Establishments." Engineering Magazine 25.1 (1903).
- Carpenter, Charles U. "How We Trained 5,000 Women." Industrial Management 55 (1918): 353-57.
- Carpenter, C. U. "Making a Success of the Small Manufacturing Business." in: Manufacturing Industries Vol. 10, Sept. 1925. p. 125-8

== Patents ==
- Carpenter, Charles E. "Electric controlling and reversing switch." U.S. Patent No. 806,735. 5 Dec. 1905.
- Carpenter, C. U. "Design for a handle for document-files." U.S. Patent No. D42,991. 10 Sep. 1912.
- Carpenter, Charles U. "Fireproof safe." U.S. Patent No. 1,116,382. 10 Nov. 1914.
- Carpenter, Charles U. "Sheet-metal structure." U.S. Patent No 1,373,865, 1921.
- Carpenter, Charles U. "Typewriting machine." U.S. Patent No 1,451,203, 1923.
