= Alexander Hamilton Church =

English efficiency engineer, accountant and writer

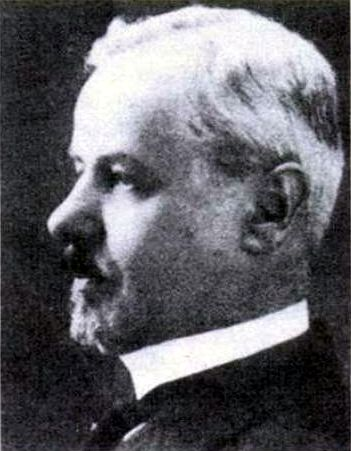
Alexander Hamilton Church

Alexander Hamilton Church (28 May 1866 – 11 February 1936) was an English efficiency engineer, accountant and writer on accountancy and management, known for his seminal work of management and cost accounting.

== Biography ==
Church was born in Uxbridge near London to Richard Stephen Hamilton Church and Jane Grace Quick Clemence, both American. His father was the grandson of Philip Schuyler, a general in the American Revolution and a United States Senator from New York. There were some rumors that his father was an illegitimate son of Alexander Hamilton, who had married another of General Schuyler's daughters. Alexander H. Church grew up in England, where he received a liberal education.

Church started his career at the British National Telephone Company. Over the years he became a technical expert in electrical engineering and started working as manager in an electrical manufacturing business. He rejoined the telephone company and organized and opened their factory at Birmingham, England. Subsequently he became secretary for multiple manufacturing companies. For a period of seven years he was European manager for The Engineering Magazine. Late 19th century he was mentored by J. Slater Lewis (author of "The Commercial Organization of Factories"), and started writing on accountancy and management, publishing his first article in the Engineering Magazine in 1890.

Church moved to the United States between 1900 and 1905, where he started working as consulting engineer In the next decade with his consulting firm made a special study of factory organization and manufacturing efficiency. He further wrote the notable works "The Proper Distribution of Expense Burden" (1908) and "Production Factors in Cost Accounting and Works Management" (1910).

== Work ==
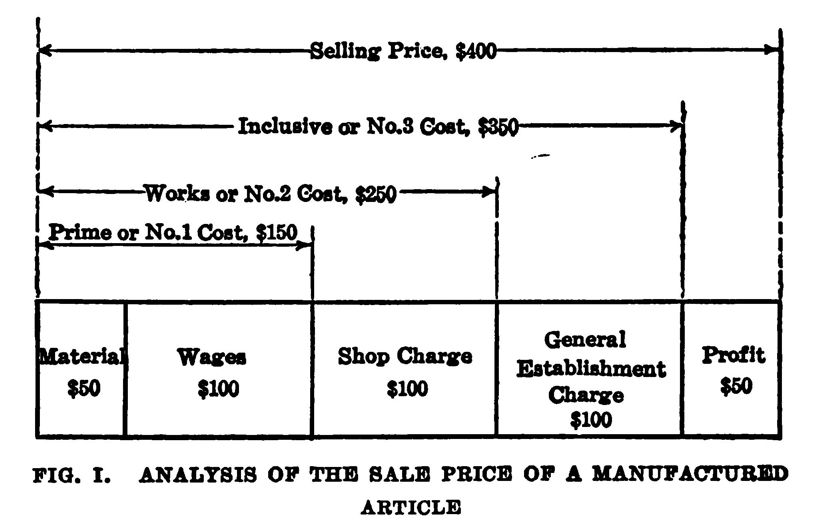
Analysis of the Sales Price of a Manufactured Article, 1908

Church became known as one of the pioneers in reducing the commercial organization of factories to the basis of a science, a work in which he was associated with J. Slater Lewis in Britain. He also worked with Hans Renold, who is credited for introducing scientific management to England.

In the United States Church worked with L.P. Alford and developed a systems of management principles partly based on the ideas of Charles Babbage. Their theory contrasted Taylor's shop management principles, and paved the way to modern industrial management.

Church first book "The Proper Distribution of Expense Burden" was published as a series of articles in the Engineering Magazine in 1901, and as book in 1908. This became a reference for accounting both in The United States and England.

== Selected publications ==
Books:

- 1908. The Proper Distribution of Expense Burden (second edition, 1913)
- 1910. Production Factors in Cost Accounting and Works Management
- 1914. Science and Practice of Management
- 1917. Manufacturing Costs and Accounts
- 1923. Making an Executive

Articles, a selection:

- Church, Alexander Hamilton, “The Meaning of Commercial Organization,” in The Engineering Magazine, December 1900. Vol. 20, pp. 391–398
- Church, Alexander Hamilton, “The Proper Distribution of Establishment Charges.” in Engineering Magazine, July to Dec. 1901.
- Church, A. H. "Premium, Piece-work and Expense Burden." in: Engineering Magazine, Vol. 46, New York, 1913. pp. 7–18, 207–216.
