= Frederick A. Halsey =

American mechanical engineer and economist

Frederick Arthur Halsey (July 12, 1856 – October 20, 1935) was an American mechanical engineer and economist, who was long-time editor of the American Machinist magazine, and particularly known for his 1891 article titled "The premium plan of paying for labor."

== Biography ==
Halsey was born in Unadilla, New York to the physician Gaius Leonard Halsey, and Juliet Cartington Halsey. He was the younger brother of Francis Whiting Halsey (1851–1919), who became a noted American journalist, editor and historian. At the age of 22 in 1878 Frederick graduated from Cornell University with a degree in mechanical engineering.

Halsey was editor of the American Machinist. In his famous 1891 paper "The Premium Plan of Paying for Labor", he argued "against piecework payment and profit-sharing, and proposing an incentive wage system with an hourly wage, production requirements, and additional pay incentives for workers who exceed production goals -- had a major impact on the subsequent structure of labor pay in America and Britain."

In 1902 he was representative of the National Association of Manufacturers and successfully opposed the metric system adoption in the United States. In 1917 he was one of the founding members the American Institute of Weights and Measures to keep opposing the adoption of the metric system in the US.

In 1922 he was awarded the ASME Medal by the American Society of Mechanical Engineers for "eminently distinguished engineering achievement".

== Work ==
=== The Premium Plan of Paying for Labor, 1891 ===
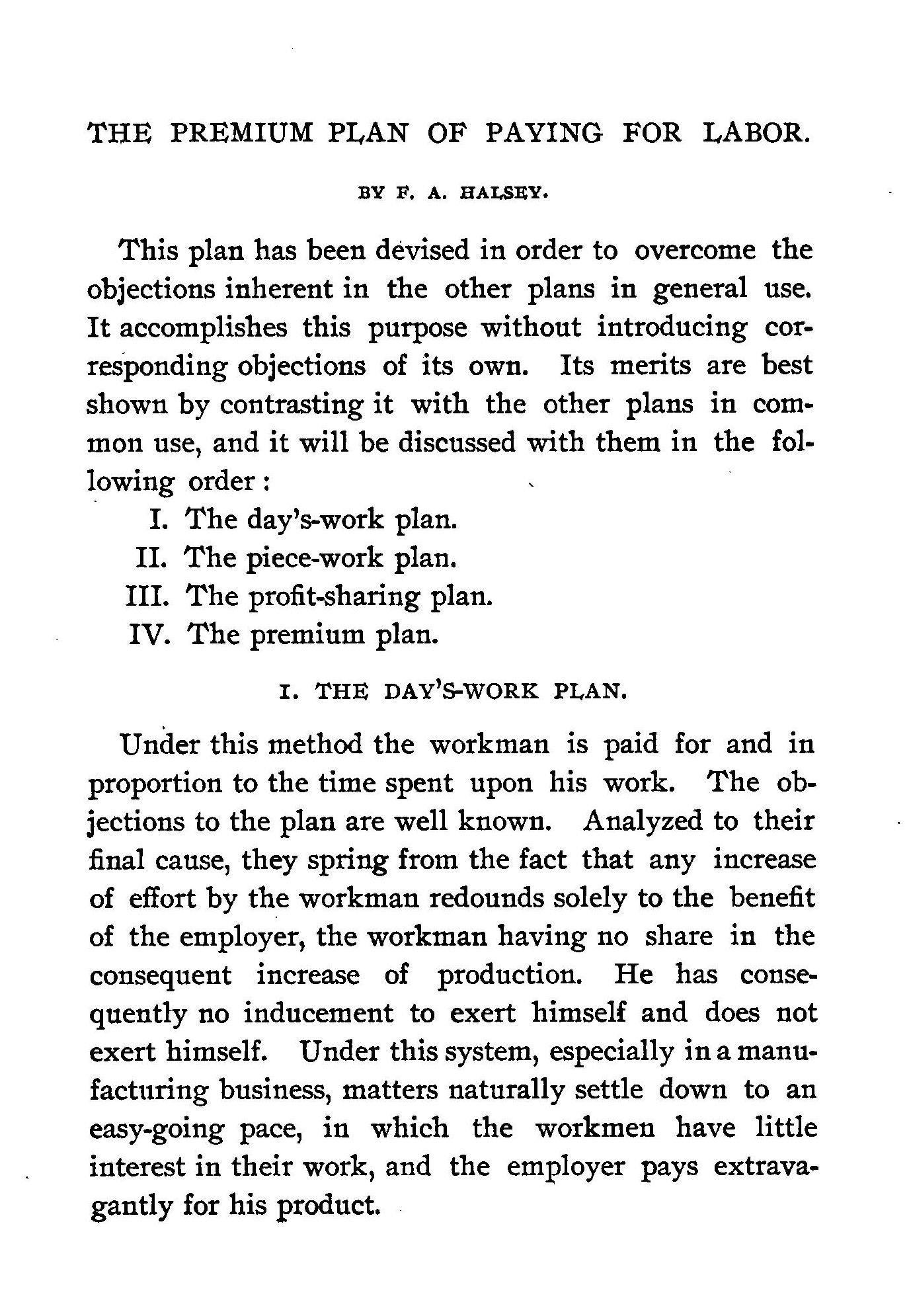
The Premium Plan of Paying for Labor, 1891

At the June, 1891, meeting of the American Society of Mechanical Engineers, Halsey presented a paper entitled "The Premium Plan of Paying for Labor." In this paper Halsey presents four types of labor payment:

- The day's-work plan : the workman is paid for and in proportion to the time spent upon his work.
- The piece-work plan : the workman is paid for and in proportion to the amount of work done.
- The profit-sharing plan : in addition to regular wages, the employees are offered a certain percentage of the final profits of the business.
- The premium plan : The time required to do a given piece of work is determined from previous experience, and the workman, in addition to his usual daily wages, is offered a premium for every hour by which he reduces that time on future work, the amount of the premium being less than his rate of wages.

Hugo Diemer (1904) summarized:

Halsey briefly outlines the advantages and disadvantages of the day-work plan, the piece-work plan, and the profit-sharing plan, and then describes the premium plan as used by himself, citing specific instances illustrating the working of the method. 'Under the day-work system, matters settle down to an easy-going pace, and the employer pays extravagantly for his product.' With regard to piece work, Halsey discusses at length the evils of rate-cutting. He presents as an objection to the piece-work plan an argument that may in many cases be a strong one in its favor, namely, that it requires a knowledge and record of the cost of each piece of a complicated machine, and oftentimes of each operation on each piece, thus limiting its application to products which are produced in considerable quantities...

And furthermore:

... With regard to profit-sharing, he objects that any system of profit distribution based on collective rather than individual efforts is unfair, that the remoteness of the reward is a disadvantage, that in bad business years there will be no distribution, and that the workmen have no check on the correctness of the employers' figures.

With regard to the premium system, he advocates varied hourly premium rates for time gained, depending on the character of the work, a detail that deserves more attention than it has generally received.

In the discussion, Mr. William Kent attests to the fact that Mr. Halsey spoke to him about the premium plan a year or so prior to Mr. Towne's discussion on gain-sharing. Mr. Kent introduced the method at that time in the shops of the Springer Torsion Balance Company.

This work contributed to the wider discussion among British and American engineers about the development of a costing system for factories. It was among the works of initial contributions as Captain Henry Metcalfe (1885/86), Emile Garcke (1887), Henry R. Towne (1891), etc., and notable further contributions came from Arnold, Sterling Bunnell, Alexander Hamilton Church, Hugo Diemer, Henry Laurence Gantt, Lingan S. Randolph, Oberlin Smith, Frederick Winslow Taylor, etc.

=== The time ticket ===
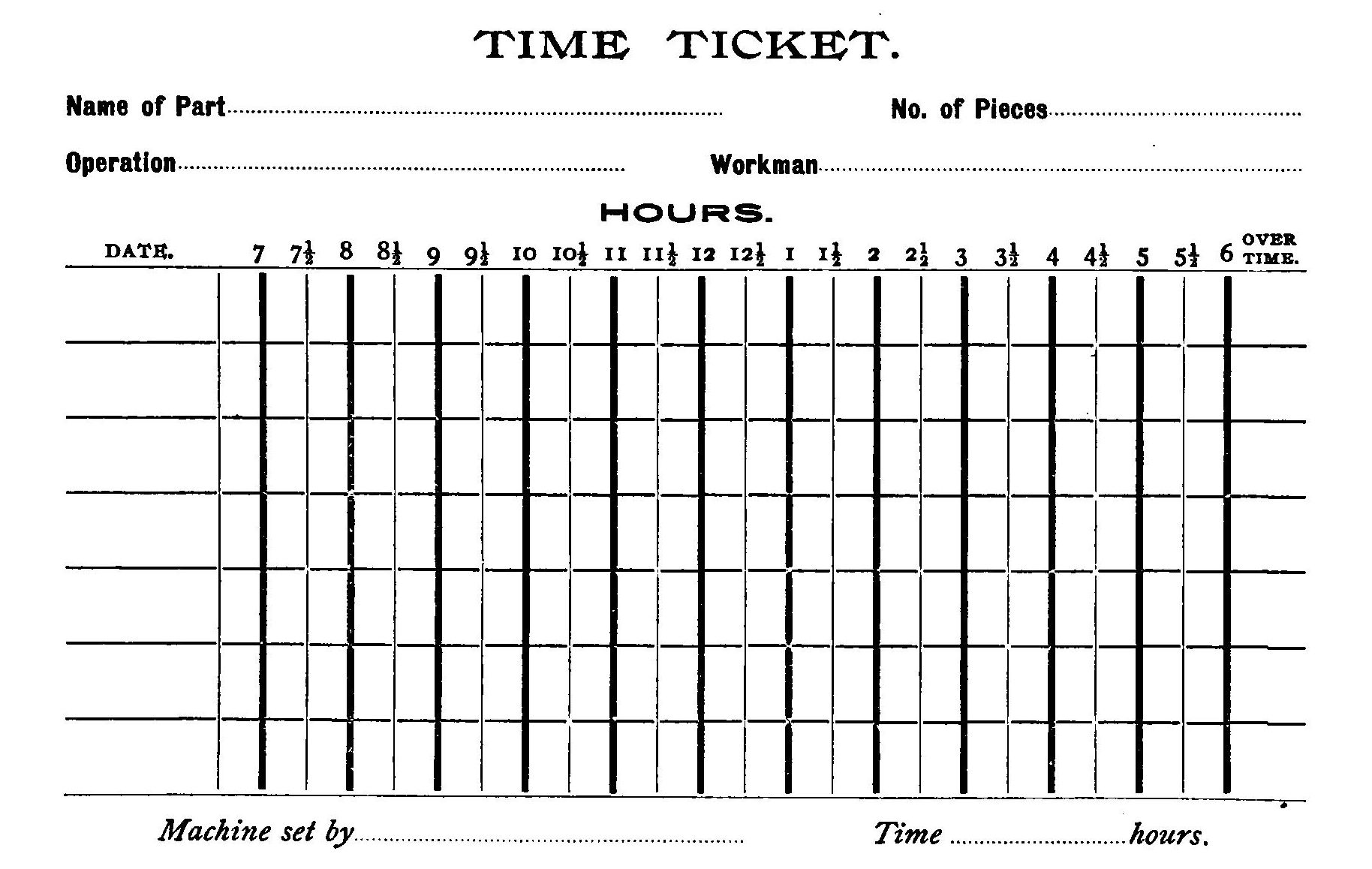
Time ticket, 1891

For the implementation of his "premium plan" for labor payment and production control, Halsey (1891) proposed the form of time ticket. He explains that this ticket should be:

...issued by the foreman, the blanks at the top being filled up by him. If desired as a check he punches a hole on the line, indicating the hour when the work is given out, repeating the same when the work and ticket are returned. The record of the time is kept by drawing a line between various hour marks, an operation which the most illiterate can perform.

It was the intention that the ticket should be used over several days' work, should not be returned until the work is completed, and should contain the record of the entire job. As such, the card has similarities with the Shop Order Card presented by Captain Henry Metcalfe in his "Card system for cost accounting and production control", presented six years earlier.

Halsey further explained how his premium plan should work. A standard time is set in advance and registered on the back of the ticket. On the back of the ticket was printed:

According to previous experience this work should require . . . hours. If completed in less time than that a premium of . . . cents will be paid for each hour saved.

Furthermore, Halsey explained that "when the ticket is returned, a comparison of the back with the front shows the premium earned. This is entered opposite the workman's name in a book kept for the purpose, which is a companion to the usual time book or payroll."

== Selected publications ==
- Frederick A. Halsey, "The Premium Plan of Paying for Labor", Transactions of the American Society of Mechanical Engineers, XXII (1891),
- Halsey, Frederick Arthur. Slide Valve Gears: An Explanation of the Action and Construction of Plain and Cut-off Slide Valves. D. Van Nostrand Company, 1894.
- Towne, Henry Robinson, Frederick Arthur Halsey, and Frederick Winslow Taylor. The adjustment of wages to efficiency: three papers... Vol. 1. No. 2. For the American economic association by the Macmillan company, 1896.
- Halsey, Frederick Arthur. The locomotive link motion. Press of Railway and Locomotive Engineering, 1898.
- Halsey, Frederick Arthur. The premium plan of paying for labor. Cornell University, Sibley Journal Press, 1902.
- Halsey, Frederick Arthur. Worm and spiral gearing. No. 116. D. Van Nostrand Company, 1903.
- Halsey, Frederick Arthur, and Samuel Sherman Dale. The metric fallacy. D. Van Nostrand Company, 1904.
- Smith, Charles Follansbee, and Frederick Arthur Halsey. The Design and Construction of Cams. Hill Publishing Company, 1906.
- Halsey, Frederick Arthur. Handbook for Machine Designers and Draftsmen. McGraw-Hill book Company, Incorporated, 1913.
- Halsey, Frederick Arthur. Methods of machine shop work: for apprentices and students in technical and trade schools. McGraw-Hill Book Company, inc., 1914.
