= Henry Metcalfe (military officer) =

American military officer and business theorist

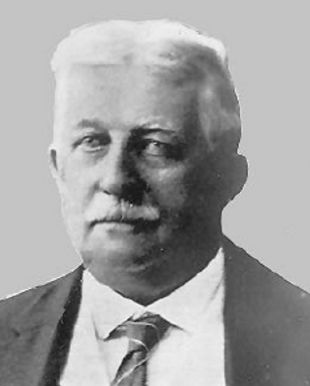
Captain Henry Metcalfe

Captain Henry Metcalfe (October 29, 1847 – August 17, 1927) was an officer in the United States Army Ordnance Corps, inventor and early organizational theorist, known for his 1873 invention of a detachable magazine for small arms, for his work on modern management accounting, the development of the "time card" and his theory on the role of middle management.

== Biography ==
Metcalfe was born in New York City, where his father Dr. John Thomas Metcalfe was attending physician to Bellevue Hospital Center. His father was former American Army ordnance officer, and later became professor of institutes and practice of medicine at the New York University. Metcalfe graduated on June 15, 1868, from West Point Military Academy, and was commissioned in the Ordnance Corps.

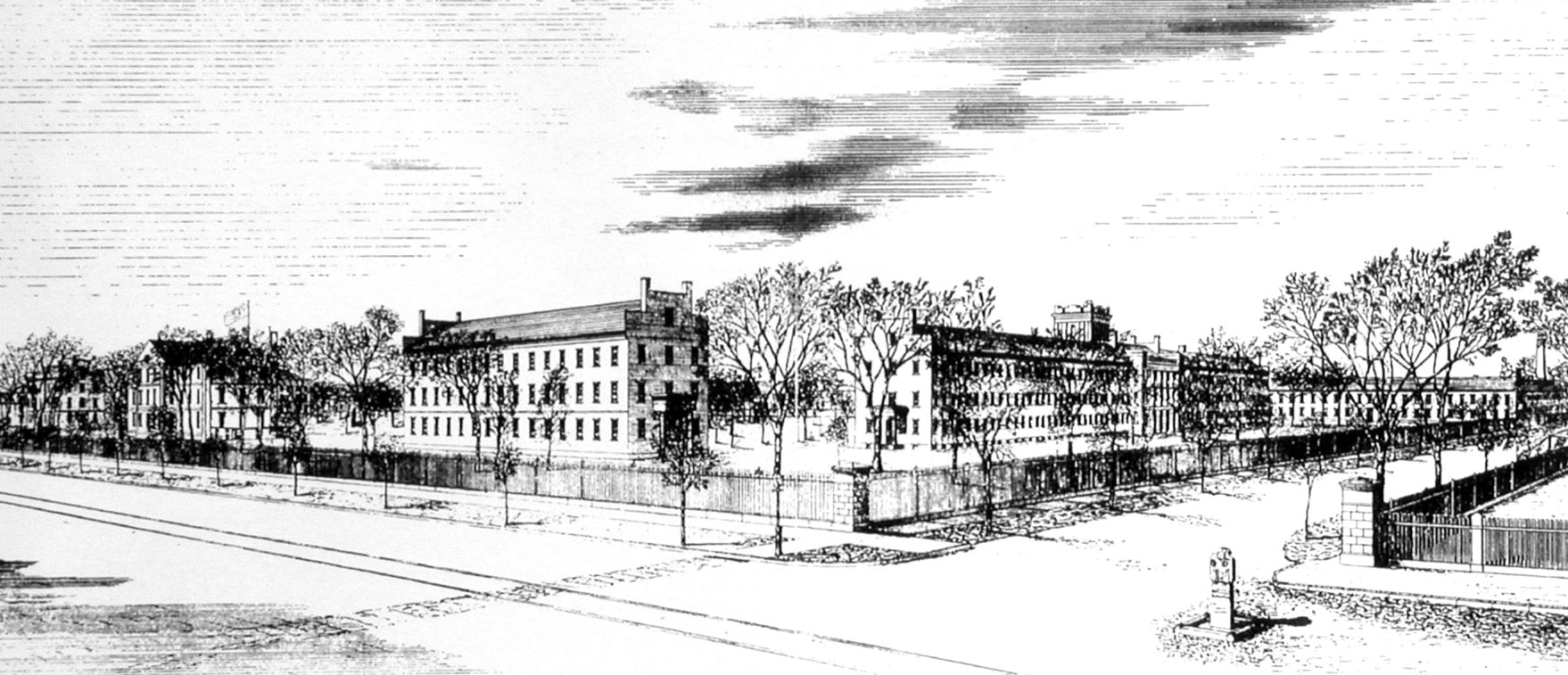
National Armory, Springfield, 1878

Metcalfe started his military career as assistant ordnance officer at the Ordnance Bureau in Washington, D.C., in early 1869. That year he was sequentially stationed at Rock Island Arsenal III, at the Military Academy as assistant professor of Spanish and as aide-de-camp of Major-General Henry W. Halleck. After a 7 1/2-month leave of absence in 1870, he was appointed executive ordnance assistant at Springfield Armory on November 11, 1870. There he developed several improvements for small firearms for which he obtained a series of patents.

On June 23, 1874, he was promoted to first lieutenant. In 1875, he was inspector at the small arms manufacturing at Providence Tool Company for three months. The next two years he participated in the presentation of the U.S. Ordnance Department at the Centennial Exposition in Philadelphia. Metcalfe superintendented the construction of the U.S. Government Building, took charge of the Ordnance Exhibit, and represented the Executive Departments of the U.S. government as Executive officer of the Board.

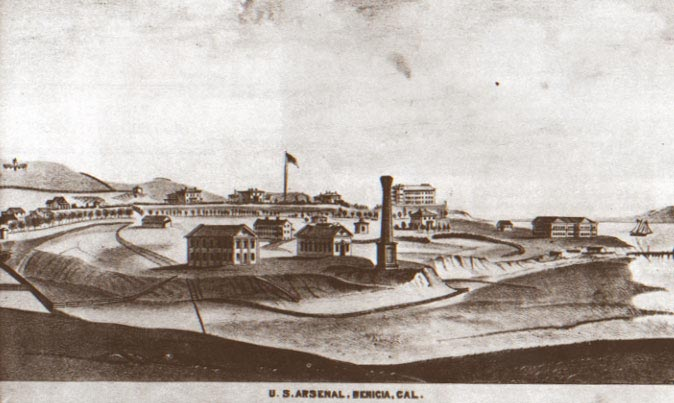
Benicia Arsenal, 1878

From late 1877 until late 1881 Metcalfe was Assistant Ordnance Officer at Frankford Arsenal, where he started developing a new shop order system and conducted time and motion studies. From late 1878 to late 1881 he was also Inspector of contract small-arms ammunition. On March 4, 1879, he was promoted to the rank of Captain. From late 1881 to late 1884 he was Assistant Ordnance Officer at Benicia Arsenal in Benicia, California, and from 1884 to August 1886 Assistant Ordnance Officer at the Watervliet Arsenal in Watervliet, New York.

In 1885 Metcalfe published the book "The Cost of Manufactures and the Administration of Workshops, Public and Private," and presented this work to the American Society of Mechanical Engineers the next year. On August 28, 1886, Metcalfe was appointed Ordnance and Gunnery Instructor at the West Point Military Academy, and published the "Course of Ordnance and Gunnery for the Instruction of the Cadets of the U. S. Military Academy." in 1890.

Metcalfe was awarded the Order of Osmanieh from the Sultan of Turkey in 1876. He retired in 1893 after he had suffered an eye injury. He settled down in Cold Spring, New York, where he kept making some inventions over the years.

Metcalfe died in Cooperstown, New York on August 17, 1927. He was buried at the West Point Cemetery on August 20, 1927.

== Work ==
Metcalfe is especially noted for his 1885 publication of The Cost of Manufactures and the Administration of Workshops, Public and Private, which presented a new method for production control, and a new accounting system based on the principle of directly assigning material costs and labour costs to jobs. But Metcalfe had come into prominence in the 1870s for designing improvements for small firearms.

=== Improvements for small firearms ===
In the 1870s Metcalfe, by then Lieutenant of the Ordnance Department at Springfield Armory, had come into prominence after construction several improvements to for small firearms. In those years he received patents for the innovation as the Improvement in metallic cartridges, 1871; the Improvement in Scabbard-Frogs, 1872; the Improvement in Hook Attachment of bans of fire-arms, 1874; the Improvement in Means of Attaching Magazines to Fire-Arms, 1875; and the Improvement in Soldiers' Accouterments, 1876. A selection of their patent drawings:

Improvements for small firearms, 1870s

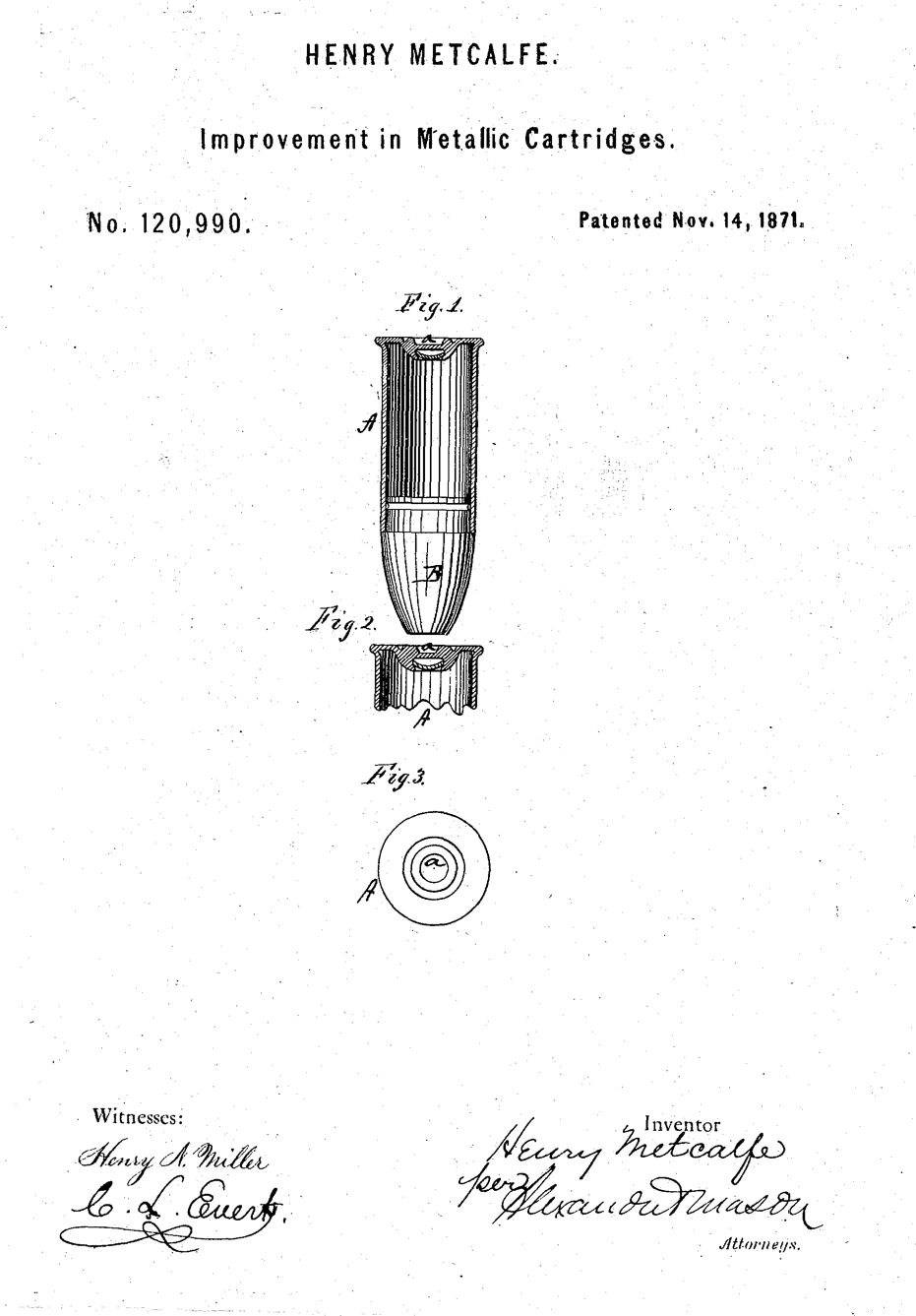
Improvement in Metallic Cartridges, 1871

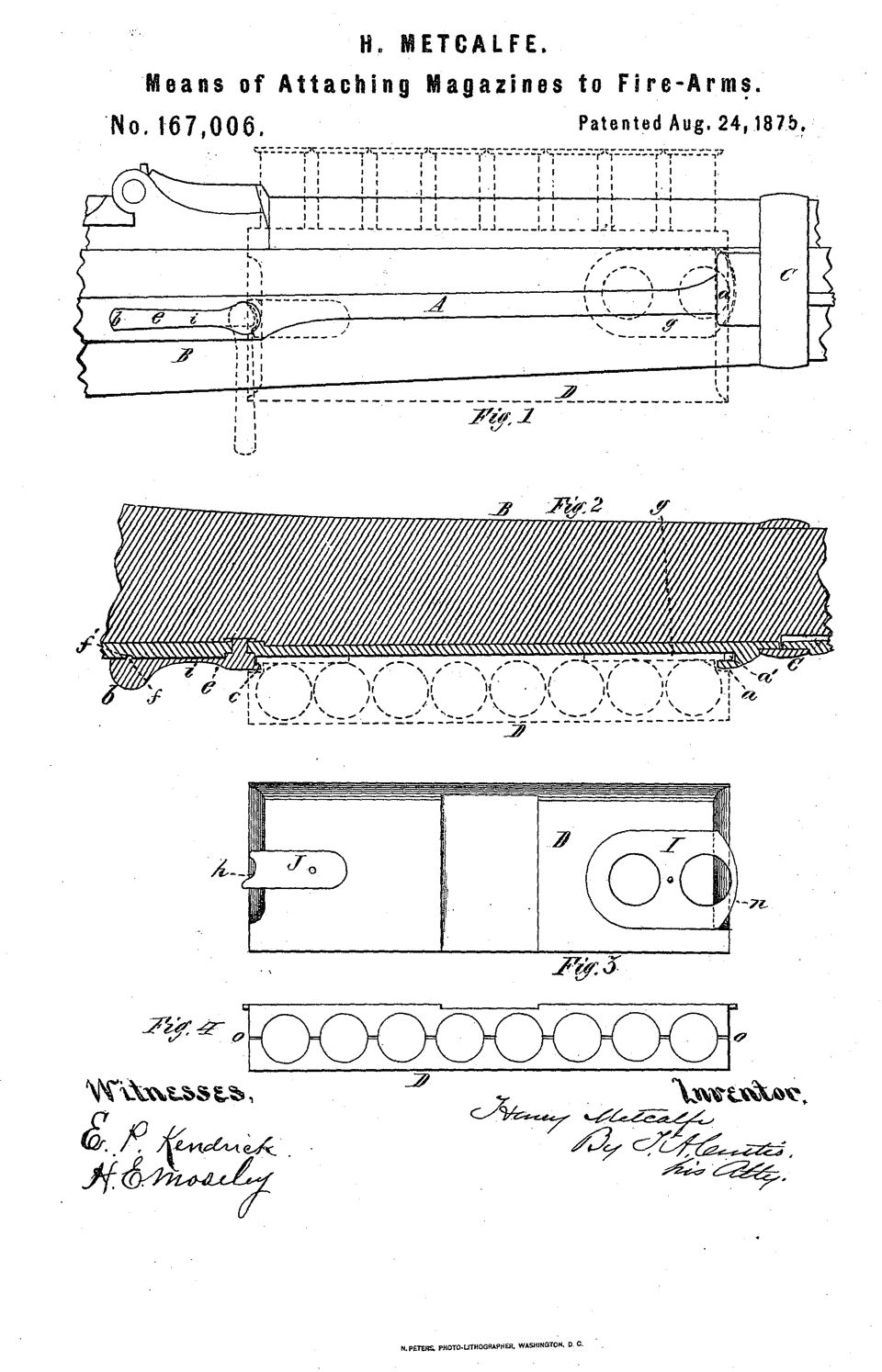
Means of Attaching Magazines to Fire-Arms, 1875

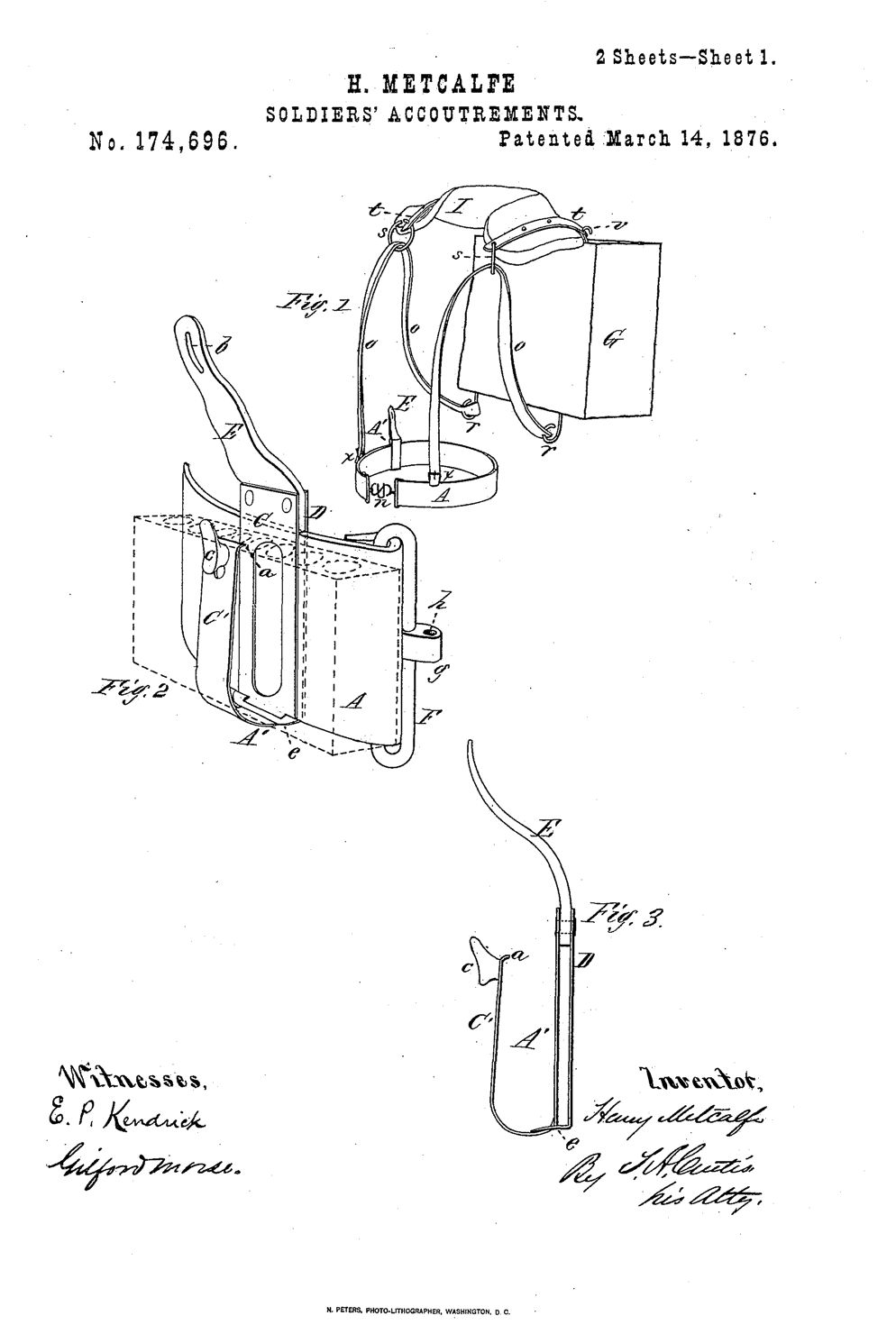
Soldiers' Accoutrements, sheet 1, 1876

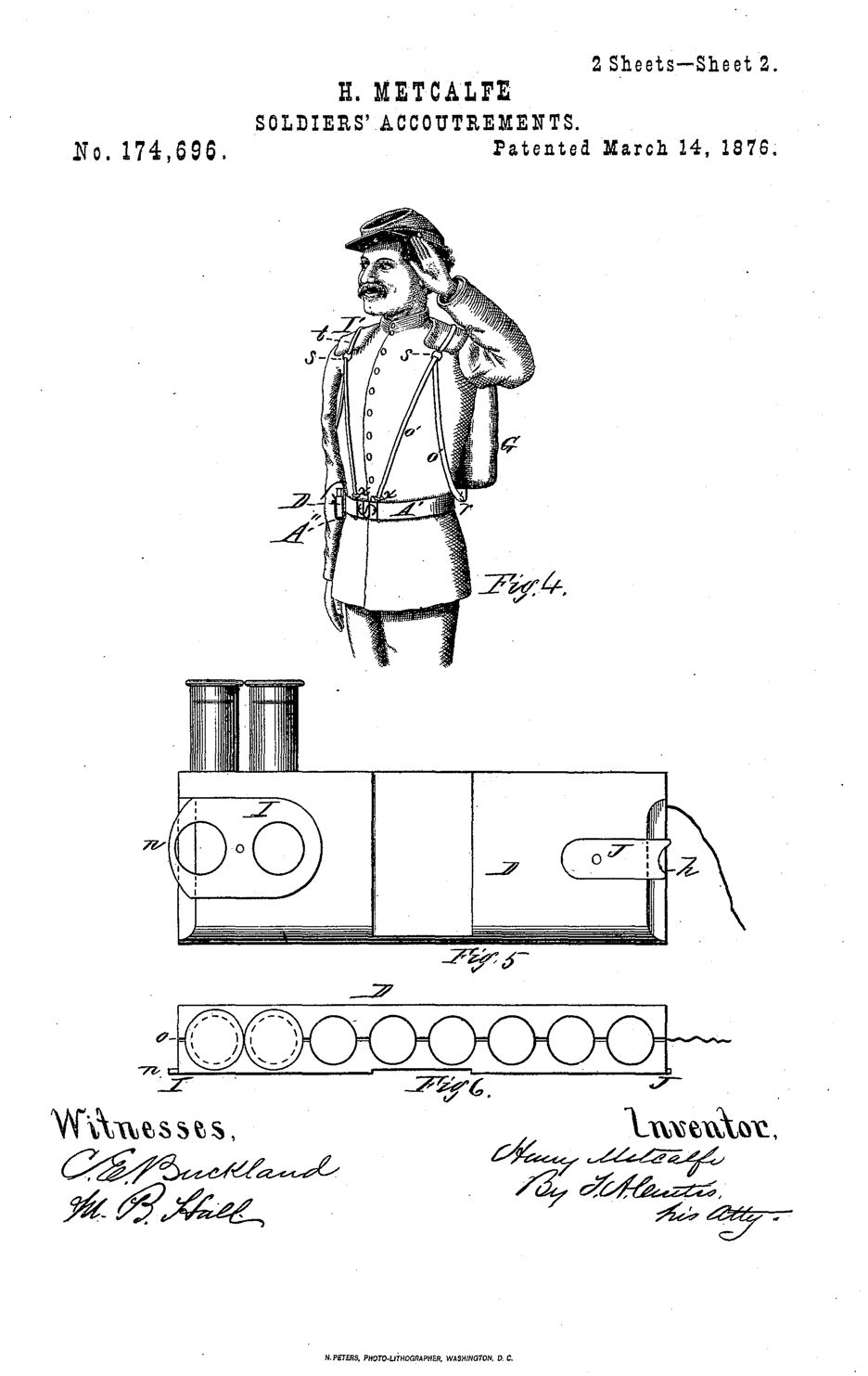
Soldiers' Accoutrements, sheet 2, 1876

Specially noted was his belt for firearms, which was called "Means of Attaching Magazines to Fire-Arms" from 1875. McChristian (2006) explained, that in those years many ammunition-carrying devices were developed but "the looped cartridge belt remained the average soldier's preference. But, it seemed that the army, in its determination to resist the belt, would go to almost any length to find an alternative. The most eccentric of these alternatives was a cartridge—block device submitted to the board by Lieutenant Henry Metcalfe of the Ordnance Department.

McChristian (2006) further explained it essence:

In simple terms, Metcalfe had designed a rectangular wooden block, bored along its upper edge for eight rifle cartridges, that could be attached to the side of the Springfield rifle just ahead of the lock... This cartridge block was affixed to the weapon by means of a special lock mechanism inletted into the stock. Several of these blocks, filled with cartridges, were to be carried on a special waist belt using a clip carrier made of spring steel with a leather fastening strap for each block. The blocks were to be made and loaded with cartridges at the army's principal ammunition plant, Frankford Arsenal.

The special waist belt was integrated by Metcalfe in a special designed Soldiers' accoutrements, which he patented in 1876 (see images). Metcalfe claimed, that the cartridge—block device would increase the rapidity of fire. Although this claim was seriously questioned, the Springfield armory adopted Metcalfe devices to 1,000 rifles. But there is no record of this device actually being tested. The type of rifle with the Metcalfe's detachable quick loader and cartridge packing box was presented at the World's Columbian Exposition in 1893.

=== The Frankford Arsenal ===
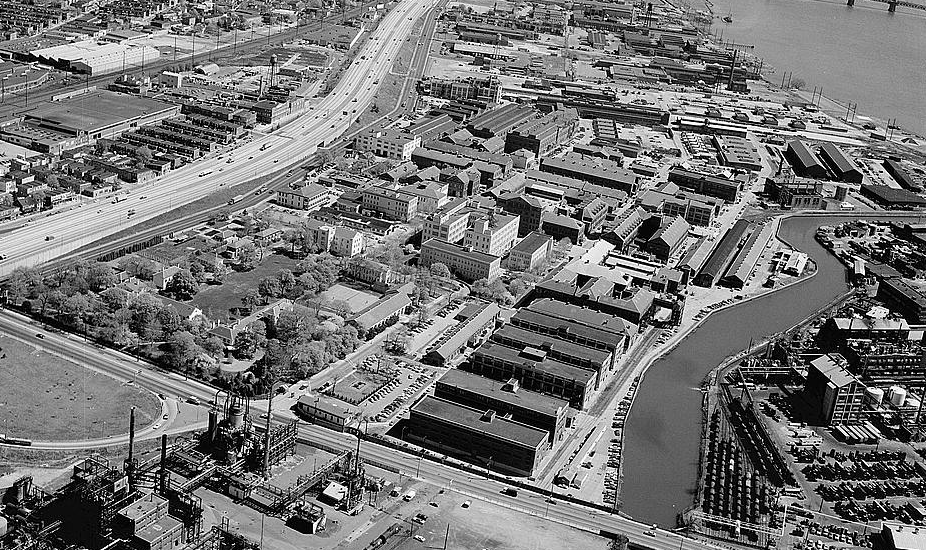
The Frankford Arsenal

Late 1870s Metcalfe joined the Frankford Arsenal. This arsenal, which opened in 1816, had developed after the American Civil War as the nation's manufactory of small arms ammunition. By the end of the war, the arsenal employed over 1,000 workers. During the Gettysburg campaign in 1863, the arsenal had provided tens of thousands of muskets and vast supplies of ammunition for Pennsylvania's "Emergency Militia" regiments. Among the innovations extensively tested at the Arsenal was the Gatling Gun, an early form of machine gun that saw extensive service in the Indian Wars, which lasted until 1890.

In Metcalfe's time at the Arsenal, it served as a major site for the storage of weapons and artillery pieces, a depot for the repair of artillery, cavalry and infantry equipment, repair and cleaning of small arms and harnesses, the manufacture of percussion powder and Minié balls, and the testing of new forms of gunpowder and time fuses. Metcalfe was appointed Officer in charge of the gun-making workshop, and worked directly under the Commanding Officer of the Frankford Arsenal. In managing the metalworking Metcalfe had at any time "about a hundred orders under way, of different kinds."

=== Basic managerial problems at Frankford Arsenal ===
When Metcalfe was appointed Officer in charge at Frankford Arsenal, one specific concern was "being unable to account for costs within the workshops." One main reason was the lack of written records. Metcalfe (1886) was principally against this phenomenon, and explained in general terms:

Now, administration without records is like music without notes--by ear. Good as far as it goes--which is but a little way--it bequethes nothing to the future. Except in the very rudest industries, carried on as if from hand to mouth, all recognize that the present must prepare for the demands of the future, and hence records, more or less elaborate, are kept'.

This was not a specific problem at the Frankford Arsenal, but a problem of all industries in that time. Yates (1992) recalled, that this was the main reason why Henry Metcalfe, and others in those days as Henry R. Towne, John Tregoning and Horace Lucian Arnold, made considerable efforts to "developed systems of shop orders to control the flow of orders through factories."

Chandler (1977) notified more general that "to Metcalfe the basic managerial problems were coordination and control." Metcalfe had illustrated this basic problem in his 1886 article with a quote from a factory owner and manager in a larger machine shop, which employed some 1,400 people. He had told Metcalfe:

The trouble is not foreseeing necessities, nor in starting the work to meet them; but in constantly running over the back track to see that nothing ordered has been overlooked, and in settling disputes as to whether such and such an order was or was not actually given and received. Superintendence... would be very different work if I were sure that an order once given would go of itself through the works, leaving a permanent trail by which I could follow it and decide positively where and by whom it was stopped. As it is, I spend so much of my time in "shooing" along my orders like a flock of sheep that I have but little left for the serious duties of my position.

These kind of experiences made Metcalfe come up with a so-called "shop-order system of accounts," which "made it possible to control the flow and improve basic cost accounting."

=== The Cost of Manufactures and the Administration of Workshops, Public and Private, 1885 ===
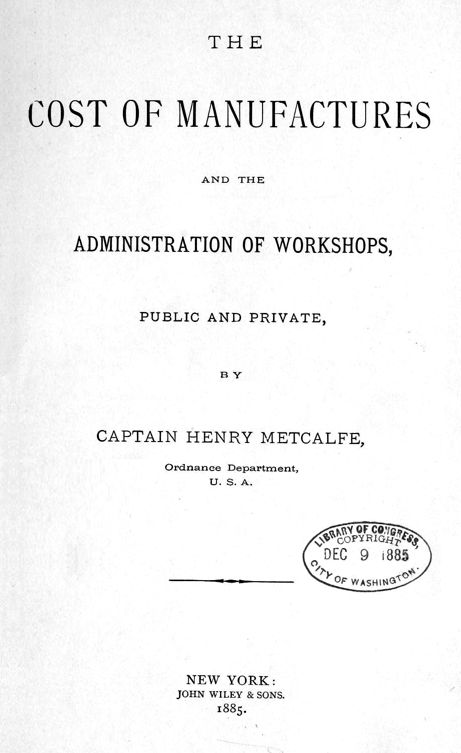
Title page, 1885

After efforts to improve the workshop administration at the Frankford Arsenal and tests at the Watervliet Arsenal, Metcalfe wrote down his experiences and ideas in The Cost of Manufactures and the Administration of Workshops, published in 1885. Hugo Diemer (1904) summarized this work as follows:

This is an exhaustive and elaborate treatise on the order, stock-room, and cost-accounting methods employed in arsenal work. The author, at the close of the work, gives a list of such parts of. the treatise as he considers general in their application. In an introductory chapter certain very sane and pertinent statements are made as to the art of administration, and its dependence upon the application of certain principles which make up what may be called the science of administration. In arguing that men intrusted with executive positions be freed from burdensome details, he says: "There is a certain economy of attention by which the more active a man's work, the less he is able of contemplation. Foremen's heads may be put to better purposes than having to bear a constant burden of solicitude about clerical work."

In the introduction of Metcalfe started arguing, that the administration of arsenals and other workshops in great measure should be considered an art. Yet, certain principles of administration could be derived from the "great variety of cases" and turn into a "science of administration." Metcalfe explained:

Since the operations of good administration are in their nature gradual, and for their successful issue depend rather upon uniform attention to their progress than upon occasional violent efforts to adjust them to the current of affairs, it will be seen that the most useful teachings are those gained from a continuous record of events... If there be a science correlative to the art of administration, it must, like every other physical science, be founded on the comparison of accumulated observations.

The key element in Metcalfe's new system is the "continuous record of events." Chatfield, (1996) explained, that in that time and place "the usual production records were informal memorandum books carried by shop foremen, only the most cursory data were kept on job orders, which were often verbally authorized and were sometimes lost track of entirely. Neither the foremen's jottings nor the formal shop ledger seemed a proper mechanism for on-the-spot recording of shop-floor events."

In the new system that Metcalfe proposed, should "each material requisition or transfer be recorded on a separate 'shop order card,' which included spaces for pricing the article and for the job number to which it was charged. To assign labor costs, each workman was given a book of cards, and as he moved from job to job, he noted the time spent on each to the nearest quarter day. In this way, a written record of costs literally followed the work through every factory department."

==== Present and proposed organization ====
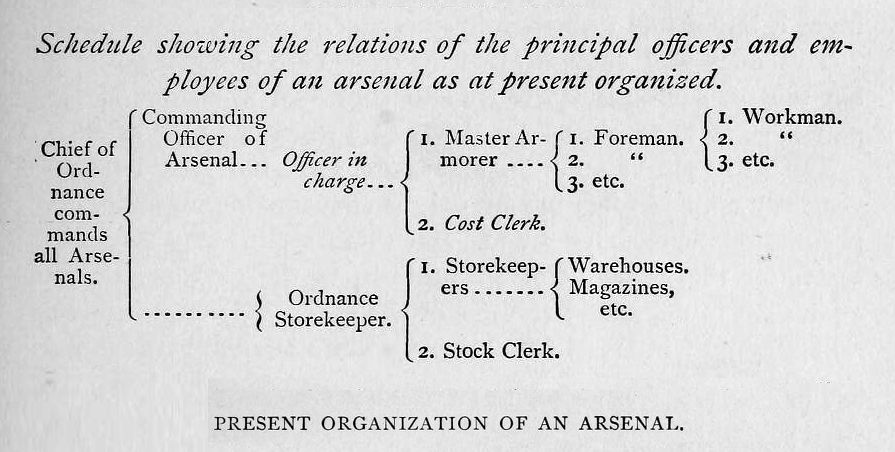
Present Organization of an Arsenal, 1885

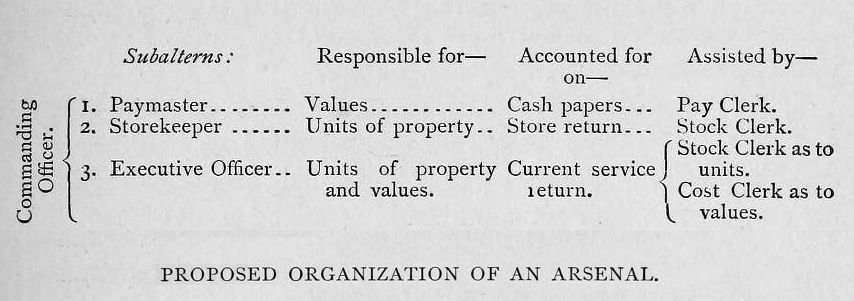
Proposed Organization of an Arsenal, 1885

Hugo Diemer (1904) further summarized the essence of the Metcalfe's 1885 work as follows:

The main body of the work is devoted to a description and criticism of old systems of arsenal accounting (which will be found even to-day to correspond to methods used in many shops), together with the results of the author's study in devising better methods of organization and accounting. The card system is very generally used, and the author illustrates every form used; filled in, in almost every case, as they would be in actual work.

Metcalfe started the description of the present and proposed organization of the arsenal with an illustration of the organization scheme (see images). About the proposed organization Metcalfe declared:

I would divide the Arsenal into three general departments, each independent of the other, but all directly dependent upon the Commanding Officer. Several functions might be united in the same person, and in the smaller arsenals the Commanding Officer might perform them all, as he does now in strictly military matters. His assistants would be:

1. The Paymaster; responsible for values only, for which he accounts on his cash papers, with which this discussion is not yet concerned.
2. The Ordnance Storekeeper; responsible for units of property, for which he accounts on the arsenal Store return and its accompanying papers, prepared by the Stock Clerk.
3. The Executive Officer; responsible for both units and values, accounting for the former by the Current service return, and for the latter by properly balanced statements of the cost of articles fabricated or otherwise transformed. The former accountability is cared for by the Stock Clerk, and the latter by the Cost Clerk.

By sharing the services of the stock clerk between these two officers in preparing papers which have so much in common, much work can be saved, and the result of what work is done be made more accurate.

The main difference in the proposed organization is, that the commanding officer gets the full responsibility for the Ordnance storekeeper, which in the old organization reported directly to the Chief of Ordnance of all US Arsenals.

==== System of administration of shop orders ====
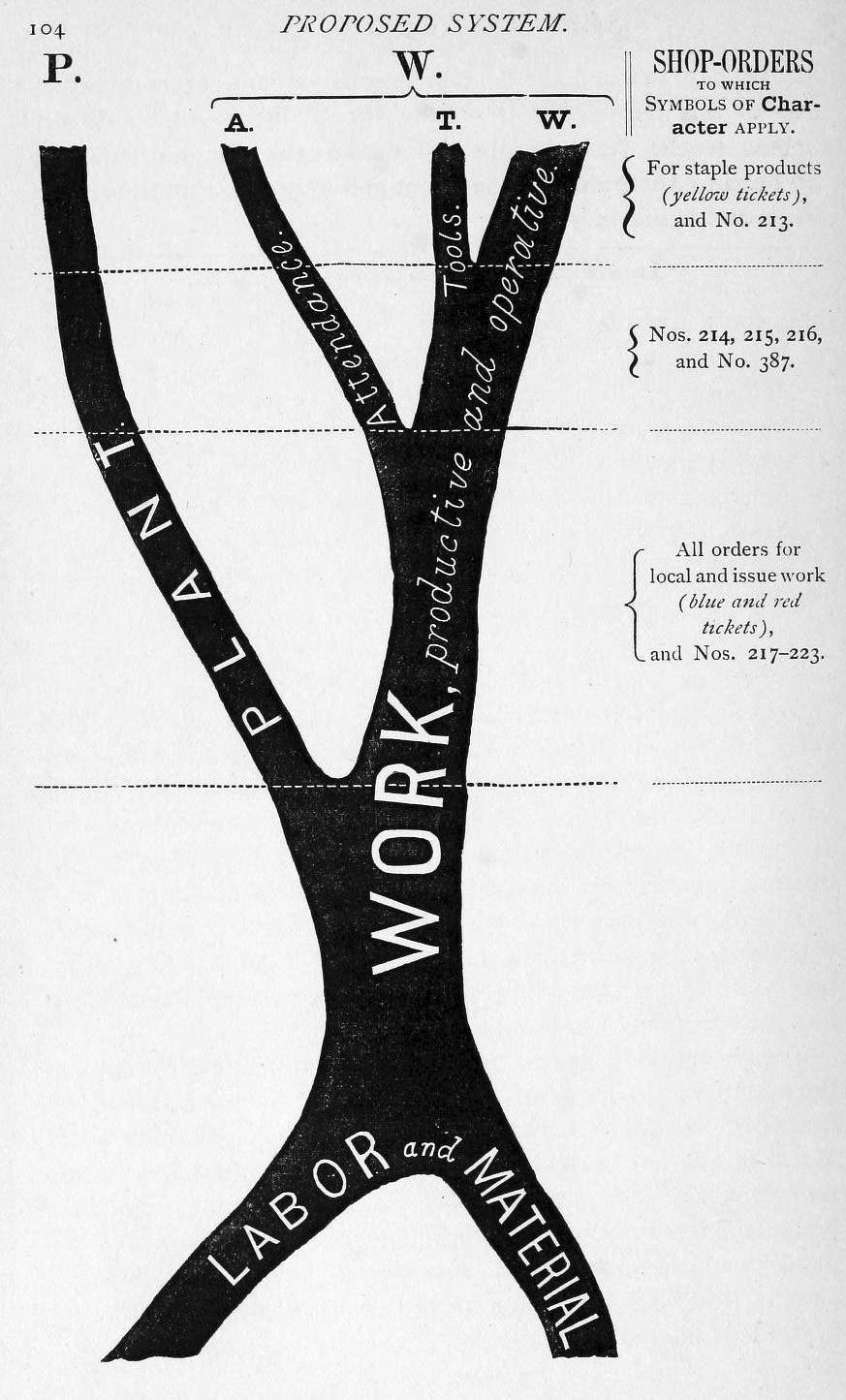
Metcalfe's Symbolic Tree of Costs in Arsenal, 1885

After an analysis of the existing organization of the Arsenal, Metcalfe proposes a new organization and a system of administration of shop orders. It involved the participation of the foremen, storekeeper and clerks, and consisted of the following books and papers to be kept:

... the following books and papers kept by foremen :

1. Reports of fabrication.
2. Reports of material returned to store.
3. Stock books of all kinds.
4. Requisition books for materials to be purchased or to be drawn from store.
5. All time books.
6. All statements of costs.

And the following by storekeepers :

7. " Stock " day-books.
8. " Material " day-books.
9. Stock ledgers.
10. Memorandum orders.
11 . Teamsters' receipts.

And the following by clerks :

12. Register of orders of supply.
13. Invoice book.

Metcalfe himself noted that "as an illustration of what this amounted to, I have in mind an establishment employing not many more than 100 men, where the books required to transact the morning's business number 18 and weigh about 60 lbs. This includes only those carried to and from the office more or less every day, and does not include those kept permanently at either end of the route."

==== Card system for cost accounting and production control ====
Metcalfe's new system of administration proposed to use cards instead of books for original entries. Metcalfe (1886) summarized the intention of this system:

For every act or name to be recorded, there shall be a separate card; so that the cards being combined or classified, the acts or names they represent will be so too. For this purpose I propose the use of single cards for all initial records, and their gradual consolidation by the simplest mechanical means until they are finally transcribed into the permanent books of record.
The independence of a representative unit of record is the basis of system I propose, combined with the use of a nomenclature by which all acts and their purposes may be set forth by the actors in such form as to be intelligible to those whose proper office it is to enroll and classify them.

And more general:

The system has three principal objects in view :

1. The prompt performance of work by the prominence given to unfinished orders.

2. The determination of the most probable cost of work and of management.
3. The keeping of an account of stock, in units of material as distinguished from their values.

It attains these objects by using three forms of cards, viz. :

1. Shop-order tickets, or warrants of expense, and records of expense reported on.
2. Service cards.
3. Material cards.

... These facilities may be either in charge of certain foremen, the costs of whose management we wish to compare, or may be too general in their nature to be assigned to any one department. The first are called departmental, and the second, general, standing orders...

Each card of the new Card system for Frankford Arsenal was specially designed to fit its purpose:

New Card system for Frankford Arsenal, 1886

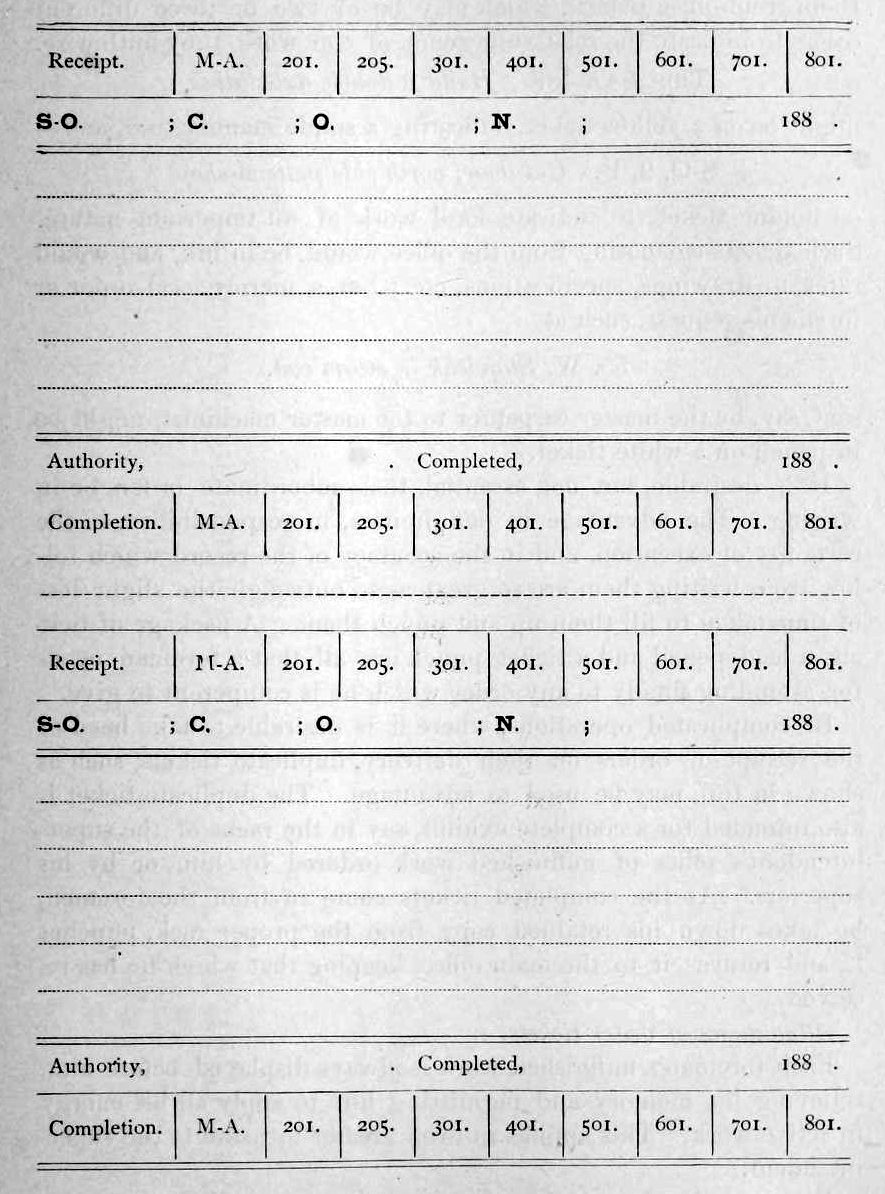
Shop Order Card

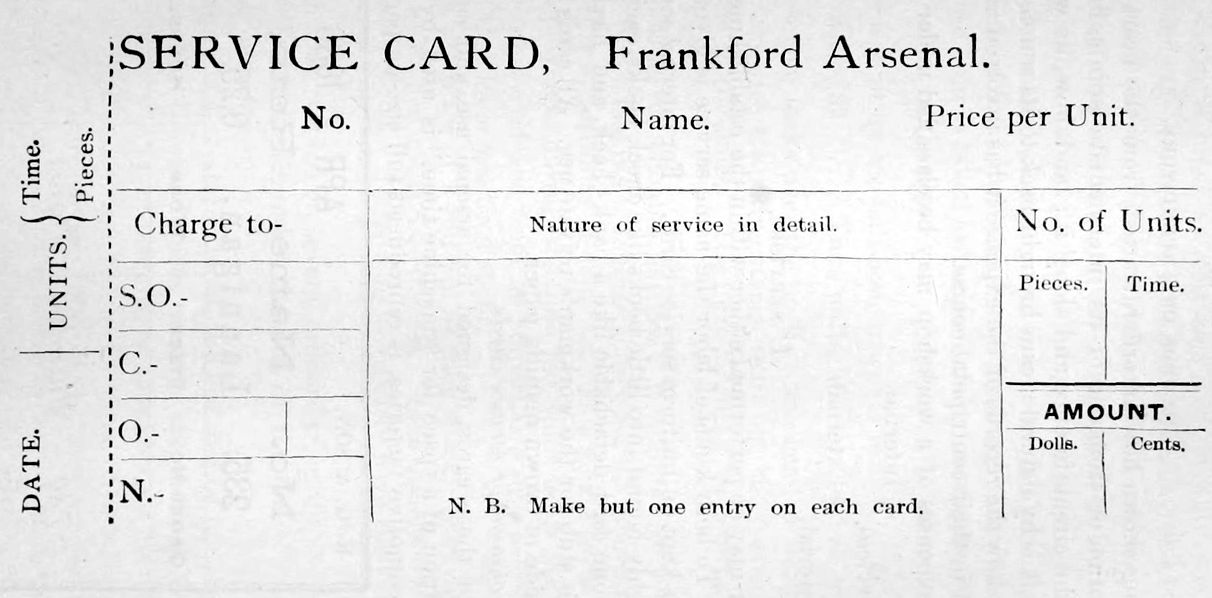
Service Card

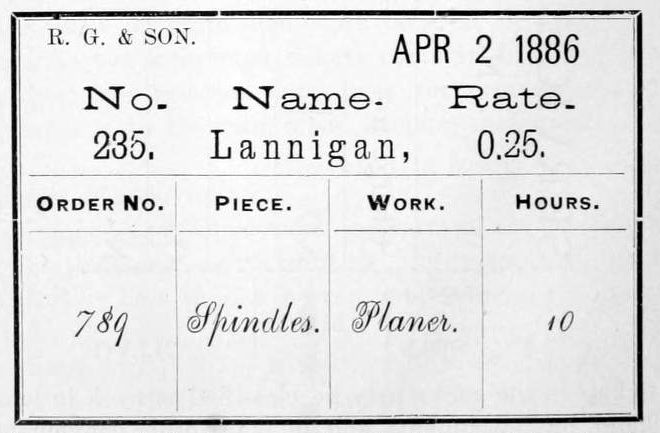
Employement [sic] of Service Card

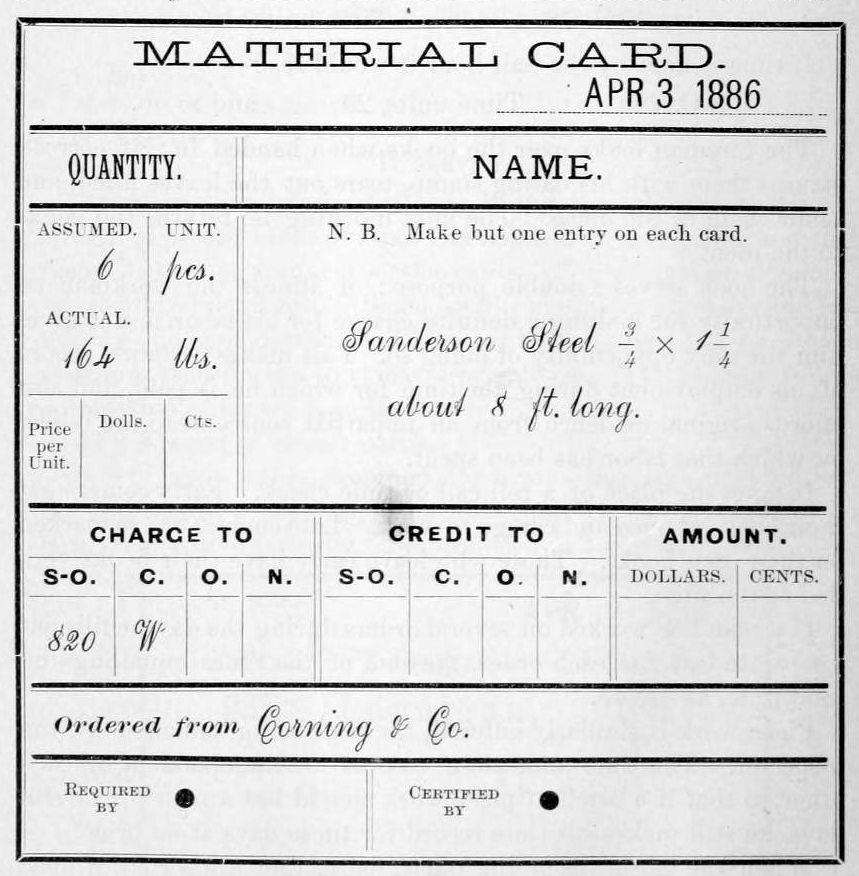
Material Card

Scranton (2000) explained some more how the system works:

Building on locomotive shop practice, Metcalfe developed three classes of cards: the shop order, a "service" or labor record, and a materials receipt. The order card authorized the work and listed the steps necessary. Foremen handed it to workers, who returned it upon task completion. Forwarded from one foreman to another through departments until fully checked off, the order card recycled to the office.
Metcalfe also issued each worker bound pads of service cards, printed with his name, hourly rate of pay, and payroll number. For each task, foremen inscribed the order number along with a brief work description, then later certified the time expended. These tickets were "as good as money," for their collation in the office authorized payroll disbursements.

Beside the Service Card, there was also designed an Employment of Service Card (see image), which was a similar card in simpler form. About the whole system Chandler (1977) notified:

Each order, after it was accepted by the factory, received a number. That number was then put on what were essentially routing slips prepared at the plant's office. These indicated which departments the order would pass through and what parts were to be fabricated and assembled. These slips accompanied materials. On them, each department foreman placed the time and wages expanded, as well as the machines and materials used on that order while it was in his department. The completed set of slips thus provided a record of the costs of labor and materials used to complete each order. They also gave an accurate account of the cost of operating each department. In addition, the ticket acted as an authority to do work and to requisition materials. It also became a "roll call or time check" on the working force.

To coordinate this system of shop accounts, Metcalfe proposed one central source, a sort of production control department, from which the system initially radiates, and towards which the system eventually should converge.

=== System of cost accounting ===
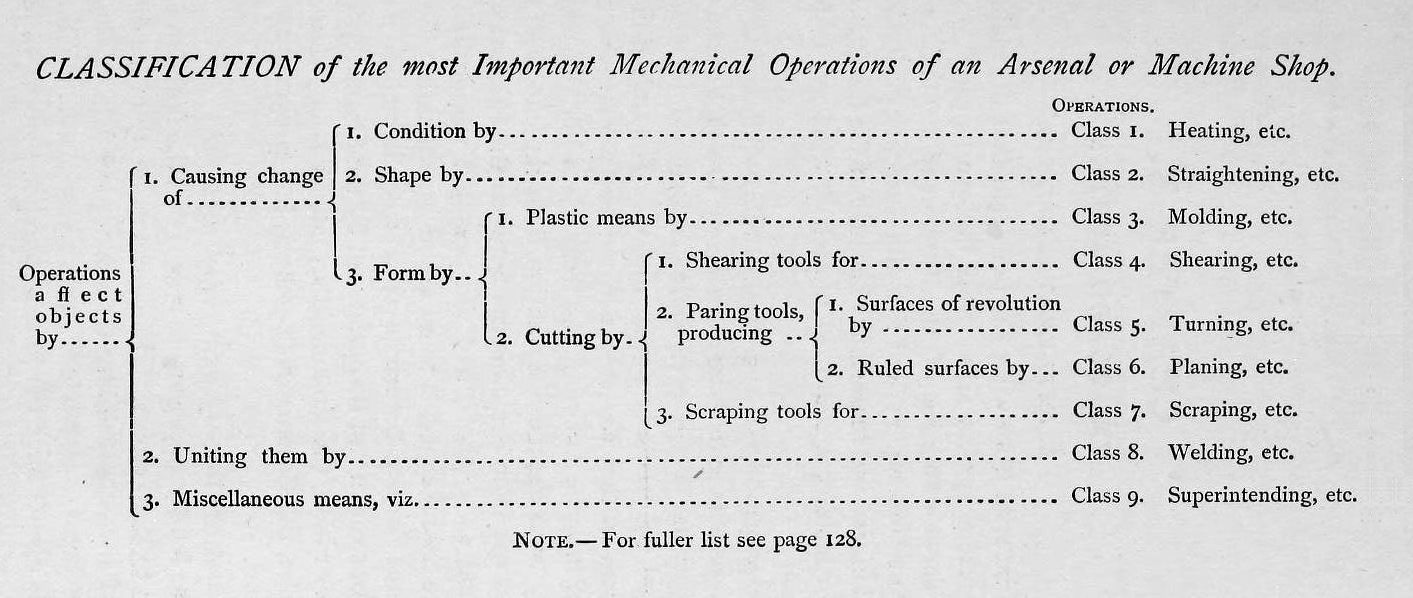
Classification of the most Important Mechanical Operations of an Arsenal or Machine Shop, 1885

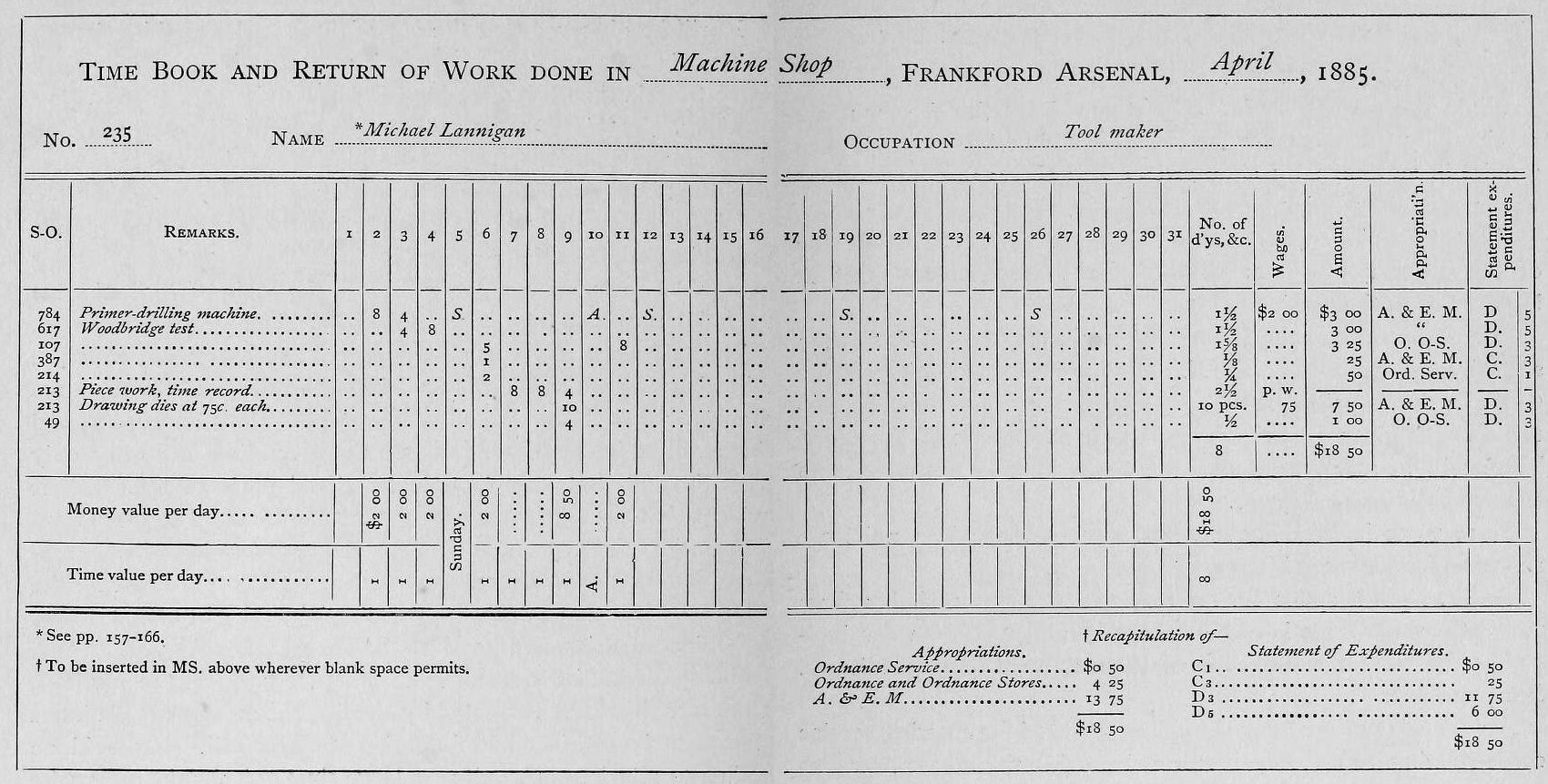
Time Book and Return of Work done in Machine Shop, Frankford Arsenal, 1885

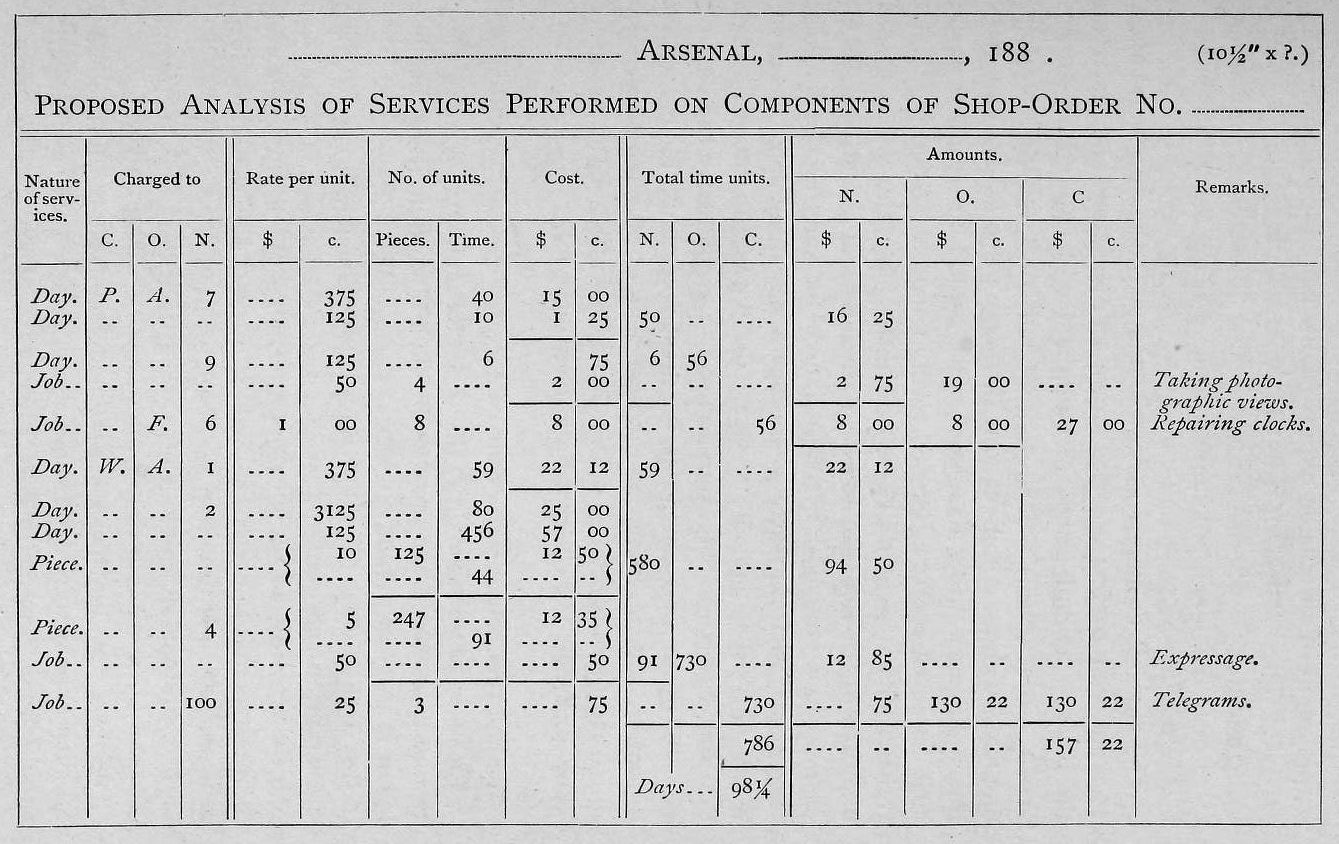
Proposed Analysis of Services Performed on Components if Shop Order, 1885

In his 1885 The Cost of Manufactures and the Administration of Workshops Metcalfe presented one of the first fully developed systems of cost accounting. This system of methods was based on multiple elements:

- Classification of the most Important Mechanical Operations of an Arsenal or Machine Shop (see image). There was further classification of possible transactions, one in the scope of the foremen, and another in the scope of the storekeeper.
- The Card system, as described above, for the real time control of the order flow, and other real time registration of the daily operations.
- Overview sheets of data such as Monthly abstracts of purchases; Time Book on return work (see image); Proposed Daily Costs Sheet; Proposed Daily Credit Sheet; etc.
- Sheets for Analysis of performances, such as service performed on components of shop-order.

The whole system, introduced in the 1885 publication, was summarized in the 1886 article, entitled "Metcalfe's cost of manufactures" in the journal Mechanics. Typical for the situation in that time is, that the article started with a description of what factory accounting is about, and what problems they are facing:

It is almost an axiom that bookkeeping consists in the classification of accounts. In commercial bookkeeping these accounts are relatively simple, and the heads of accounts being easily recognized, the balances between classes may be determined by positive rules.
But in workshop accounts it is difficult for the accountant to apportion properly the gross sums with which he deals among the different objects on which they have been expended. There is a tendency on the side of the shops, in which the knowledge must originate, simply to work in the most efficient way and to let the records take care of themselves. On the side of the offices there is a contrary tendency, requiring constant knowledge of how things are going and how similar results, when obtained under different circumstances, compare. These tendencies conflict, so that the office is always asking for more specific information than the shop is able to supply, except by guess.

To get a better understanding of how factory accounting could and should work, the article gave an explicit example:

Suppose that the total cost of a year's expenses be known, the office may want to divide them among the yearly products by some better method than that of an average based, as is sometimes done, on their weights, or on some other remote relation to their cost. Stoves, and even harness, are often appraised by weight; while it is evident that, like fret work, the less they weigh often the more they cost. Then, supposing that by any means the gross cost of a job is known, there is usually a remainder in the drawings, patterns, &c, useful for further work of the same kind, which would enable estimates for such work to be made at a lower figure than if the whole work had to be done anew. Or else the cost of some individual component of the product may be required to be separated from the gross cost, as when parts are to be made for repairs, or are to be omitted, or combined. Then, further operations may change; work on some components formerly done by hand may now be done at a less cost by machine; or labor at a different rate may be employed, the effect of which changes on the whole cost may be required to be anticipated.

The article continued to stipulate the main problem at the time:

It is safe to say that each of these steps in analysis is often attempted, and as often fails from lack of trustworthy data. If the accountant had the data he might classify them; but they are known only to the shop; and then only from day to day forgotten as new works comes along.
To remedy this, foremen are often required to keep "little books," which can never cover all the ground of subsequent investigation, and which, just so far as they do cover it, turn these foremen into accountants, forcing them into work for which few are fitted, and taking from them time and attention which could be fa better employed.

Now the article states that:

... Captain Metcalfe's book supplies a link between the shops and the office, a link which has been too long missing. The link is in the form of a constant current of data composed of independent cards; each one bearing unmistakable evidence of the purpose of the expenditure which it records. These cards dispense with all books but those of final record, and, besides the " correspondence card"... consist of two essential kinds: 1. The Service card. 2. The Material card...

The information from these card system was the input for Metcalfe's system of cost accounting. These data is used "data to determine for each department the 'indirect expenses' or overhead costs as weIl as the 'direct expenses' or prime costs. His procedures for computing the former appear to be more sophisticated than those used hy the railroads or in Carnegie's steel works. He had developed a formula to determine a 'cast factor' based on each department's contribution to the work done by the enterprise as a whole."

=== Correspondence Card ===
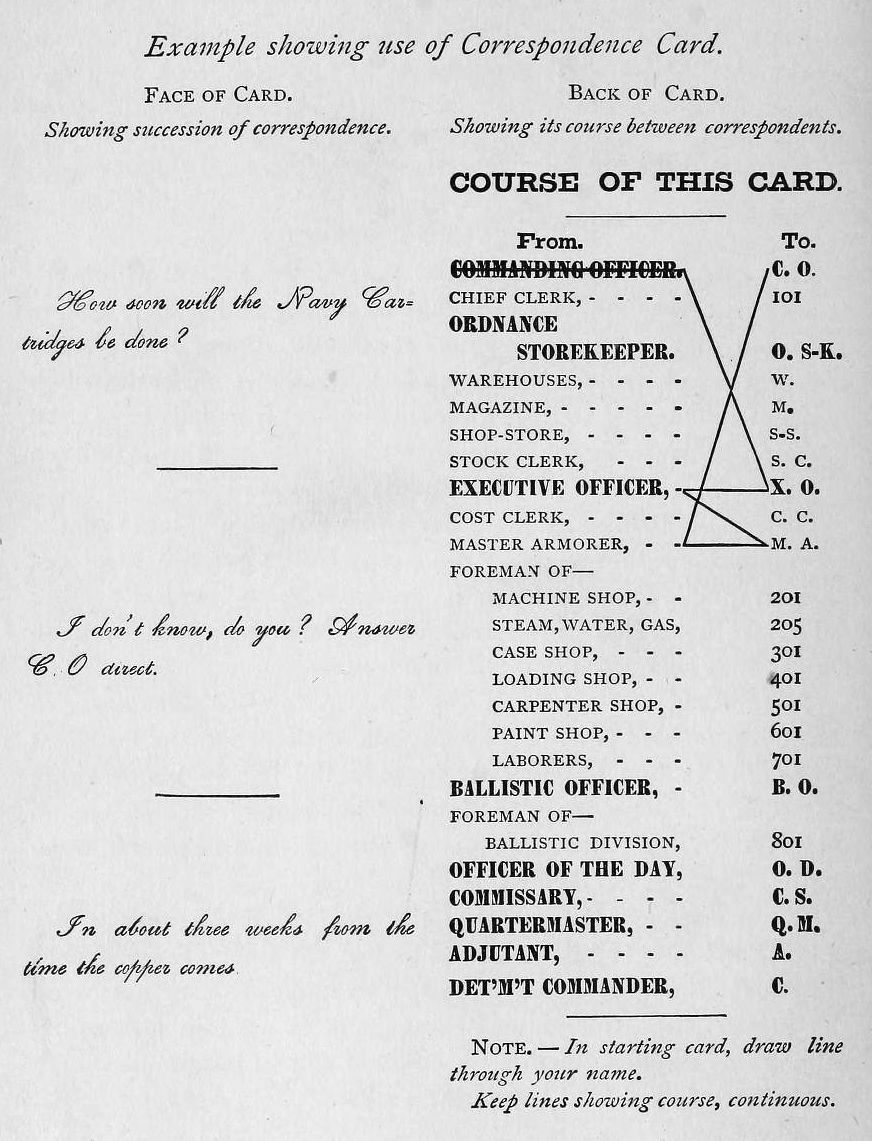
Correspondence Card, 1885

Another feature of Metcalfe's systems of cost accounting was the so-called "Correspondence Card," (see image) which shows how the order will flow around among the persons in the machine shop. The card as such is an early premature flow chart, although later flowcharts would not picture the people involved but the activities first. Metcalfe (1885) explained the card as follow:

This card, forming no essential part of the system proposed, is used as a very convenient means of asking and answering the thousand and one little questions constantly arising between the different departments of any large administration, concerning which it is not so essential to have an immediate reply as it is to ask the question or to make the statement while the need of it is fresh in one's mind. They are memoranda set in motion.
One side is blank and the other bears a double column of the titles and their abbreviations belonging to the persons most apt to correspond. One column is headed " From " and the other " To," so that a line drawn obliquely across the space between serves both as a signature and an address.
To continue the course of the card, as is often necessary, so that question and answer may explain each other, the recipient continues the line horizontally towards the left to his own title and then obliquely again to the next in order of receipt, and so on. To designate the originator of the question he should draw the line through his own name.
The messenger always takes the card to the person whose abbreviated title is nearest to the end of the line. Blank spaces are left for the insertion of such special names as may not be on the printed list. The same arrangement is used in forwarding other cards requiring action by different sets of hands.

An 1886 review in the journal Mechanics explained, that "the card may be passed around among several persons, and serves as an efficient 'tracer.' No one who has passed on it need be troubled again with the same question. The originator draws the line through his own name. If the first one 'gives it up' he, carries the line horizontally to the left to his own title and then obliquely to the original questioner, or to whomever he may wish to ask about it."

Metcalfe's correspondence card did not receive much more media attention. An exception is William Kent (1918), who even listed this card as forth basic card of Metcalfe's system. He acknowledged, that "the card system proposed by Capt. Metcalfe has been generally adopted in Government shops, but, as shown in some of the testimony given before Congressional Investigating Committees, much yet remains to be done in the way of cutting out unnecessary red tape..."

== Reception ==
After of his 1885 book, in 1886 Metcalfe wrote a paper summarizing his system, which he presented at the XIIIth Annual Meeting of the American Society of Mechanical Engineers in Chicago. In the following discussion there was a response by Frederick Winslow Taylor, which was published in the Transactions of the American Society of Mechanical Engineers. Taylor explained:

I have read with very great interest Mr. Metcalfe's paper, as we at the Midvale Steel Company have had the experience, during the past ten years, of organizing a system very similar to that of Mr. Metcalfe. The chief idea in our system, as in his, is, that the authority for doing all kinds of work should proceed from one central office to the various departments, and that there proper records should be kept of the work and reports made daily to the central office, so that the superintending department should be kept thoroughly informed as to what is taking place throughout the works, and at the same time no work could be done in the works without proper authority. The details of the system have been very largely modified as time went on, and a consecutive plan, such as Mr. Metcalfe proposed, would have been of great assistance to us in carrying out our system. There are certain points, however, in Mr. Metcalfe's plan, which I think our experience shows to be somewhat objectionable. He issues to each of the men a book, something like a check-book, containing sheets which they tear out and return to the office after stating on them the work which they have done. We have found that any record which passes through the average workman's hands, and which he holds for any length of time, is apt either to be soiled or torn. We have, therefore, adopted the system of having our orders sent from the central office to the small offices in the various departments of the works, in each of which there is a clerk who takes charge of all orders received from, and records returned to, the central office, as well as of all records kept in the department...

About fifteen years later Taylor in his 1903 Shop management further clarified his history and acknowledged Metcalfe's contributions, stating:

The card system of shop returns invented and introduced as a complete system by Captain Henry Metcalfe, U. S. A., in the government shops of the Frankford Arsenal represents another such distinct advance in the art of management. The writer appreciates the difficulty of this undertaking as he was at the same time engaged in the slow evolution of a similar system in the Midvale Steel Works, which, however, was the result of a gradual development instead of a complete, well thought out invention as was that of Captain Metcalfe.

Over the years Metcalfe's work has kept drawing some attention in the fields of Industrial engineering, and in the field of cost accounting. Nowadays Metcalfe's The Cost of Manufactures and the Administration of Workshops, Public and Private is recognized as the first modern book on cost accounting.

== Publications ==
Books:

- Metcalfe, Henry. The Cost of Manufactures and the Administration of Workshops, Public and Private. New York, J. Wiley & Sons. 1885; 2nd ed. 1890, 3rd ed. 1907
- Henry Metcalfe. A Course of Instruction in Ordnance and Gunnery: Text John Wiley & Sons. 1891.

Articles, a selection:

- Metcalfe, Henry. "The Shop-order system of accounts." Transactions of the American Society of Mechanical Engineers 7 (1886): pages 440–86.

== Patents ==
- Metcalfe, Henry. "Improvement in metallic cartridges". U.S. Patent No. 120,990. 14 November 1871.
- Metcalfe, Henry. "Improvement in Scabbard-Frogs". U.S. Patent No. 125,604. 9 April 1872.
- Metcalfe, Henry. "Improvement in Hook Attachment of bans of fire-arms". U.S. Patent No. 149,141. 31 March 1874.
- Metcalfe, Henry. "Improvement in Means of Attaching Magazines to Fire-Arms". U.S. Patent No. 167,006. 24 August 1875.
- Metcalfe, Henry. "Improvement in Soldiers' Accouterments". U.S. Patent No. 174,696. 14 March 1876.
- Metcalfe, Henry. "Road map exhibitor", US patents 841800, Oct 28, 1905.
- Metcalfe, Henry. "Pocket Memo-Case". U.S. Patent No. 1,308,437. 1 July 1919.
