= Time book =

Record of hours worked by employees

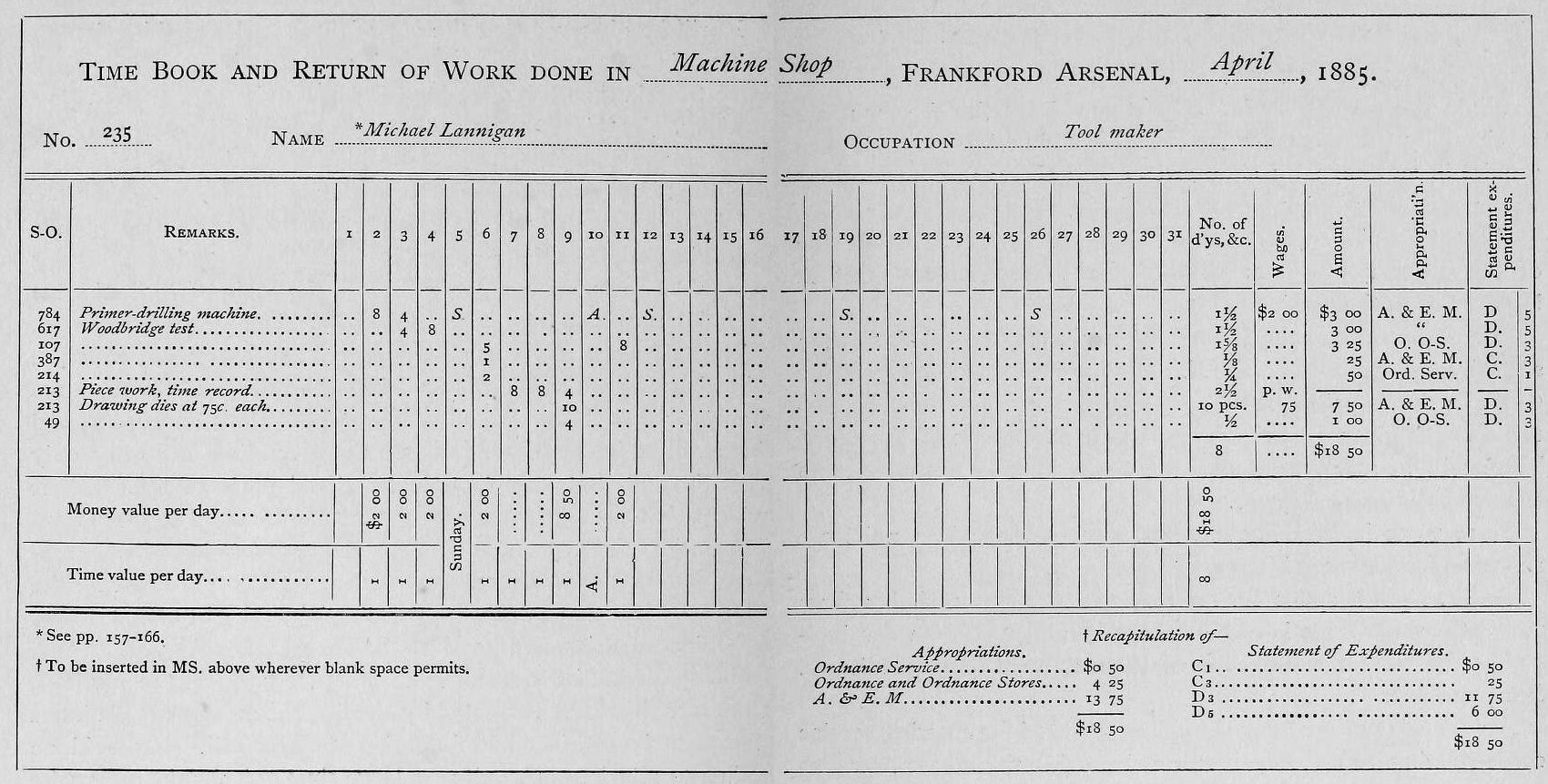
Time Book and Return of Work done in Machine Shop of Frankford Arsenal from Metcalfe's Systems of cost accounting, 1885.

A time book is a mostly outdated accounting record, that registered the hours worked by employees in a certain organization in a certain period. These records usually contain names of employees, type of work, hours worked, and sometimes wages paid.

In the 19th and early 20th century time books were separate held records. In those days time books were held by company clerks or foremen or specialized timekeepers. These time books were used by the bookkeeper to determine the wages to be paid. The data was used in financial accounting to determine the weekly, monthly and annual labour costs, and in cost accounting to determine the cost price. Late 19th century additional time cards came in use to register labour hours.

Nowadays the time book can be a part of an integrated payroll system, or cost accounting system. Those systems can contain registers that describe the labour time spend to produce products, but those registers are not regularly called time books, but timesheets.

== History ==
Before the 19th century employees could be registered on a payroll, especially in cases such as crewmembers on a ship or soldiers stationed in a location. The paid wages were noted in daybooks, in which daily expenses were registered, and eventually in the other accounts in the bookkeeping systems.

=== Origins, early 19th century ===
In the 19th century when organizations started to grow a separate register of labour hours emerged, which was called a time book. There were used to keep account of the work done. Loudon (1826) explained, that in gardening the books necessary for the system of keeping accounts are, the time-book, the cash-book, and the forest or plantation book. Loudon described how time books were handled in those days:

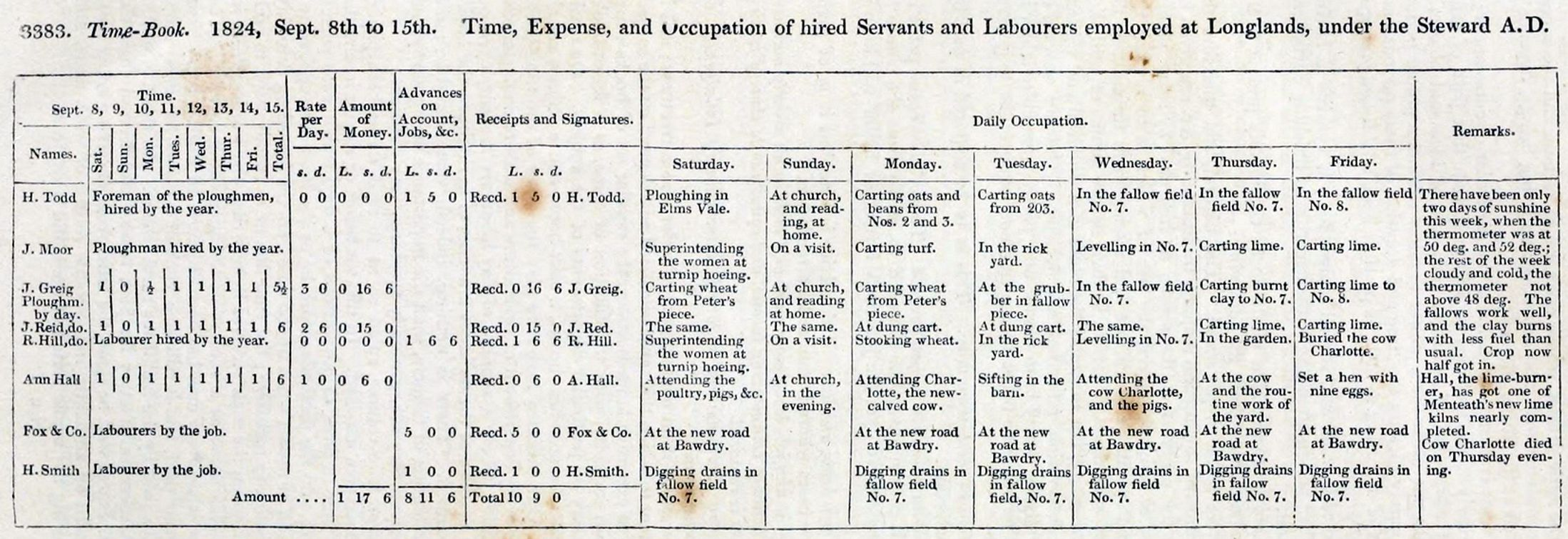
Time-Book, in Loudon 1824

The master inserts the name of every hand; and the foreman of each department inserts the time in days, or proportions of a day, which each person under his care has been at work, and the particular work he or she has been engaged in.
At the end of each week the master sums up the time from the preceding Saturday or Monday, to the Friday or Saturday inclusive; the sum due or to be advanced to each man is put in one column, and when the man receives it he writes the word received in the column before it, and signs his name as a receipt in the succeeding column.
The time-book, therefore, will show what every man has been engaged in during every hour in the year for which he has been paid, and it will also contain receipts for every sum, however trifling, which has been paid by the gardener for garden-labour.

And furthermore:

In short, it would be difficult to contrive a book more satisfactory for both master and servant than the time-book, as it prevents, as far as can well be done, the latter from deceiving either himself or his employer, and remains an authentic indisputable record of work done, and of vouchers for money paid during the whole period of the head gardener's services.
In laying out grounds in a distant part of the country, where upwards of two hundred men were employed under one foreman, we have had their time, employment, and payments recorded, and receipts taken, in this way, and found it an effectual bar to every thing doubtful or disagreeable.

In those days time books, as Loudon explained, were used on farms, but also in mines and in the emerging Iron and steel industry. Occasionally time books were also used to register the time, that a working steam engine had been in operation.

=== Accounting in industry, mid-19th century ===
With the emerge of larger machine shops mid 19th century accounting methods developed in larger farm companies were applied in the growing industry. In his 1885 book on factory accounting Metcalfe gave a description of normal system of labour registration mid 1870s:

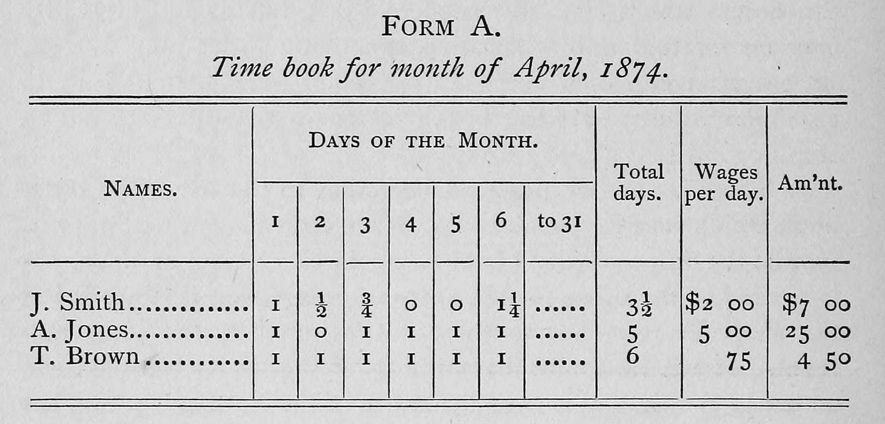
Time book for month of April, 1874

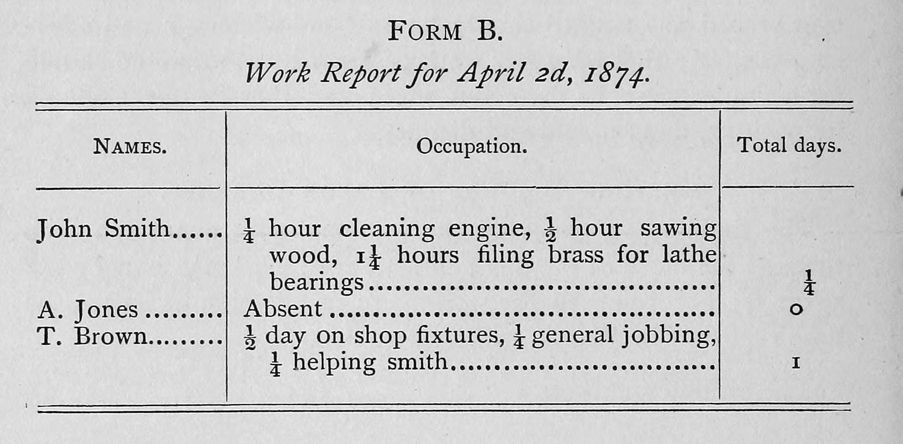
Work Report for April 2d, 1874

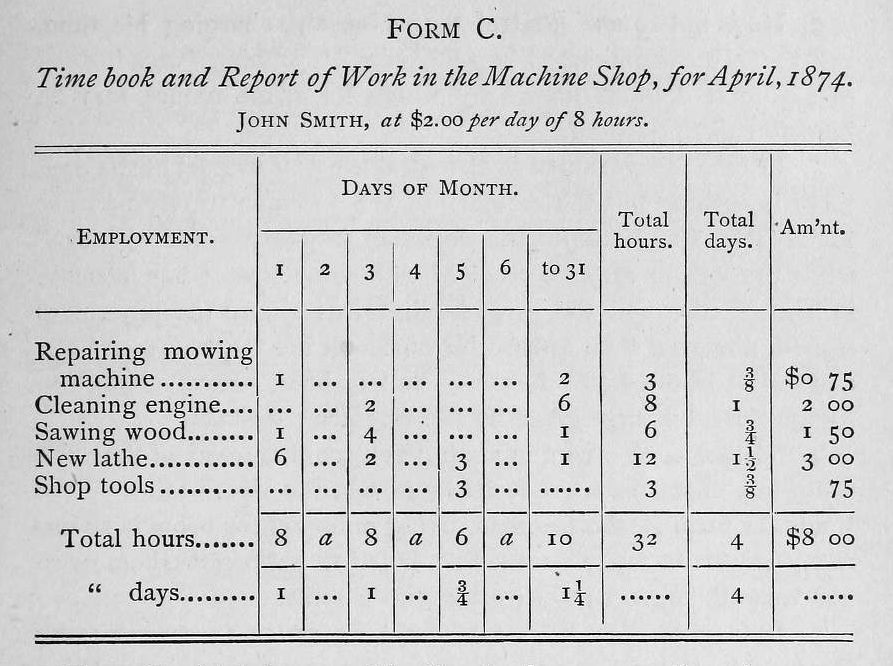
Time book and Report of Work in the Machine Shop, for April, 1874.

The timekeeper, generally the foreman, goes about the shop towards the close of the day and asks each workman how he has spent it; according to the workman's recollection he enters the time reported in a book, as hereafter described.

Metcalfe noted that "an exception to this practice existed in [his] time at the National Armory, where, in some departments, each workman entered on a little slip of paper in his own language, the manner in which his time had been employed. This and the time were copied into the time book; but nothing more was done with the tickets. This practice was the germ of the system herein developed."

Metcalfe (1885) continued to explain the general forms of time book (see images):

There are two general forms of time book;

- one, form A, in the nature of a pay-roll, in which the time made by each man during each day is entered in gross;
- and forms B and C, in which an attempt is made to show how the time so reported has been employed.
  - Form B occupies a page for each day, and a line for each man. To save copying the names anew each day, it is customary to paste a fly slip on the back of the first page, which, being unfolded, serves for all successive pages and also gives more room for the daily record of employment.
  - Form C, which is a combination in form as well as in name, was in use at the National Armory during my service there. Its great advantage over form B is the greater space it affords for inserting the names of employments upon which the workman has been engaged. It also permits the use of a smaller time unit, and consequently of a more exact definition of its record; for in form B the small space allotted for a description of the work, and the need of re-writing it every day tends naturally to the consolidation of entries; whereas in form C an entry once made stands good for the whole month, provided that the workman always calls the same work by the same name.

Sequentially Metcalfe saw a series of objections against the existing time books registration (based on form B and C):

1. The workman has to remember so suddenly all the jobs he has worked on during the day, that he is very apt to make mistakes by lumping different jobs under one head; or by calling the same work by different names, or different work by the same name on different days.
2. He is apt to use general terms loosely, charging his time, say, to " Miss. Repairs," " Shop Fixtures," " Jobbing," etc., instead of giving it definite names by which its exact nature may be hereafter distinguished.
3. In case the workman is absent, during all or part of the day, there is nothing but the memory of the foreman to rely upon as to the fact. For example, the workman may be marked " absent " when present, or may be credited with some time when absent; in neither case will the error be discovered until the pay-roll is signed, nor even then unless the workman has kept his own time, and unless in the latter instance he has been honest enough to forego the advantage given by the foreman's mistake.
4. Besides such errors in stating the gross amount of time, the following mistakes are not infrequent in the distribution of the time: In form B, the foreman, being cramped for room if he has many entries to make on one line, is led to abbreviate them or to condense them, so as to save himself trouble.

Metcalfe main concern was, that he was unable to account for costs within the workshops, and as main reason he saw the lack of written records.

=== Factory accounting, late 19th century ===
With the further development of machine shops into machine factories late 19th century, a new type of accounting, called factory accounting, emerged which to related to that new more complex practice. In the 1886 Captain Henry Metcalfe was the first, to proposed a new system for piece work in the machine shop. This system introduced an additional service card for the direct registration of working time spend on the work floor. Metcalfe (1886) explained:

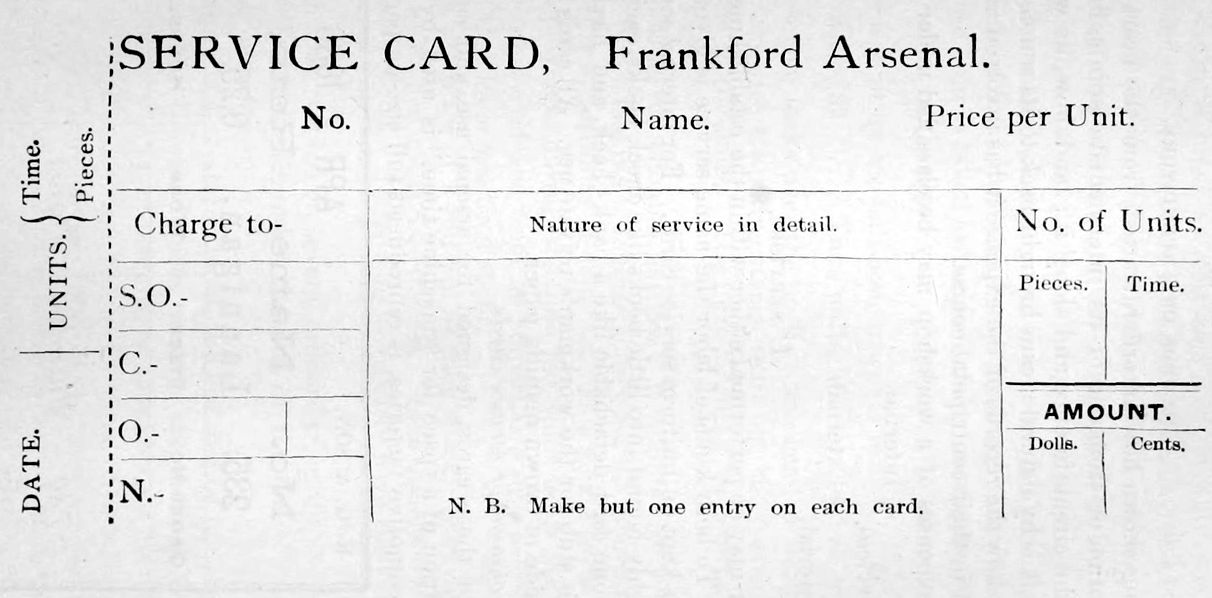
Service Card, Frankford Arsenal 1886,

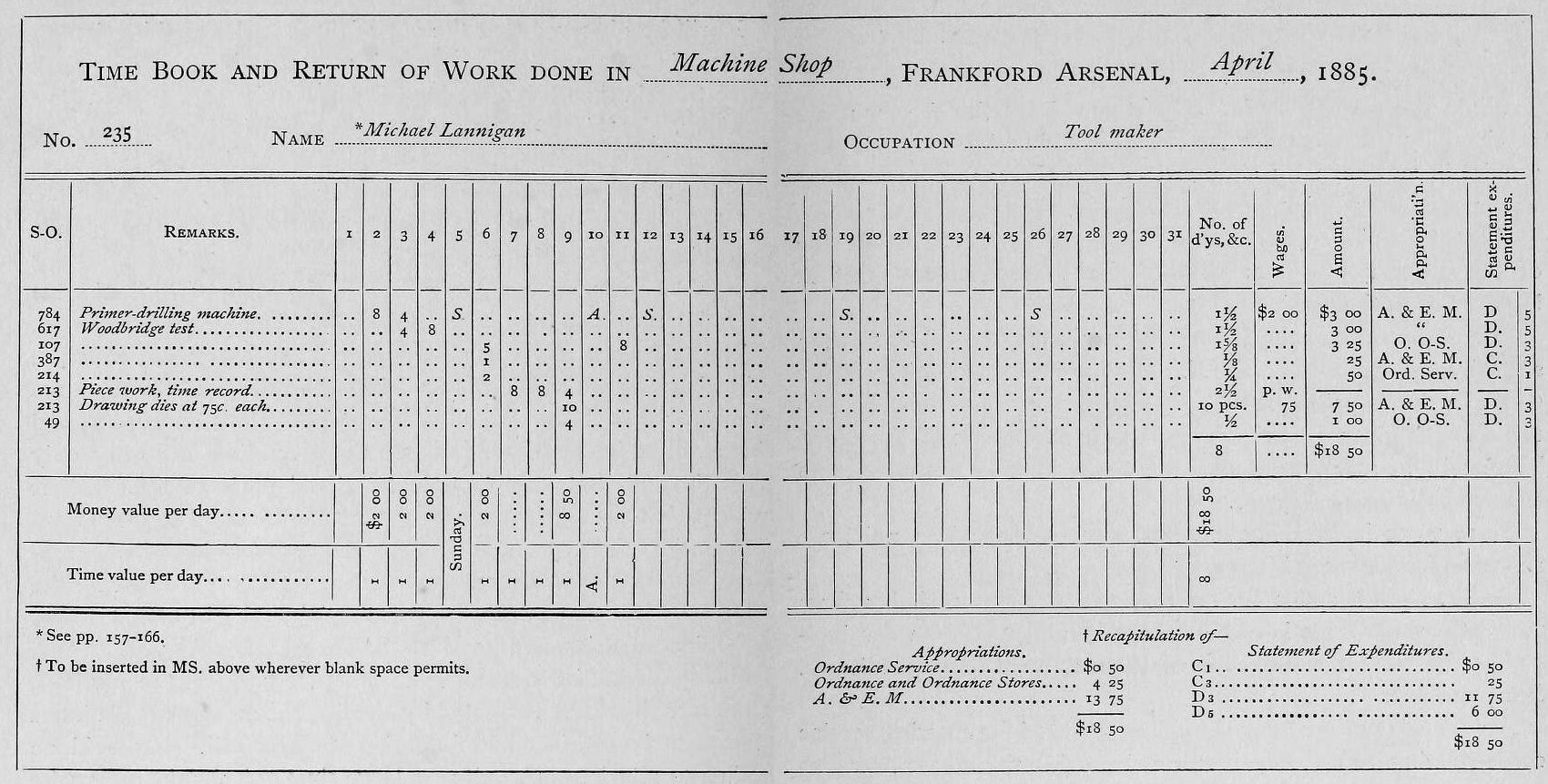
Time Book and Return of Work done in Machine Shop, Frankford Arsenal, 1885

A man working on piece work, who has completed a suitable batch of pieces, makes out a ticket to correspond, and gives it with the pieces made to the foreman or inspector. If the work receives the inspector's approval, he punches the service card and forwards it with the other cards. Whatever deductions are necessary, are indicated on the face of the card, so that it may tell its own story completely. The amount space may be filled, or not, at pleasure; it is for convenience in saving recomputation.

Besides making a charge for his labor, it is almost as necessary that the piece workman shall inform the office of how much time he has spent on his work, so as to guide the office in future adjustments of the tarif...

... The cards go to the Cost Clerk and are shuffled, first, by names of workman; second, by shop-order numbers under each name. The time is then entered in the time book... opposite to the shop-orders on which the man has been employed. This is to enable each workman's wages to be charged to the proper appropriation....

In Metcalfe's proposed system the time book is no longer register for the primary registration of labour time. The time spend is first recorded on a "service" or labor record card. About the use of the service cards in relation to the time books Metcalfe (1885) further explained:

When the service cards, duly stamped by the foreman, are received by the cost clerk, he sorts them first by names if they require it, and then by shop-orders, and enters the gross results under each shop-order on the time book... Except for piece workers, the time book carries the subdivision of the order no further; details of the employment must be looked for on the service cards.

Another system for time recording in railways was described by Marshall Monroe Kirkman in his The science of railways, Vol 9. 1895. In this system a division was made in a general time book and several specialized time books for different sorts of employees:

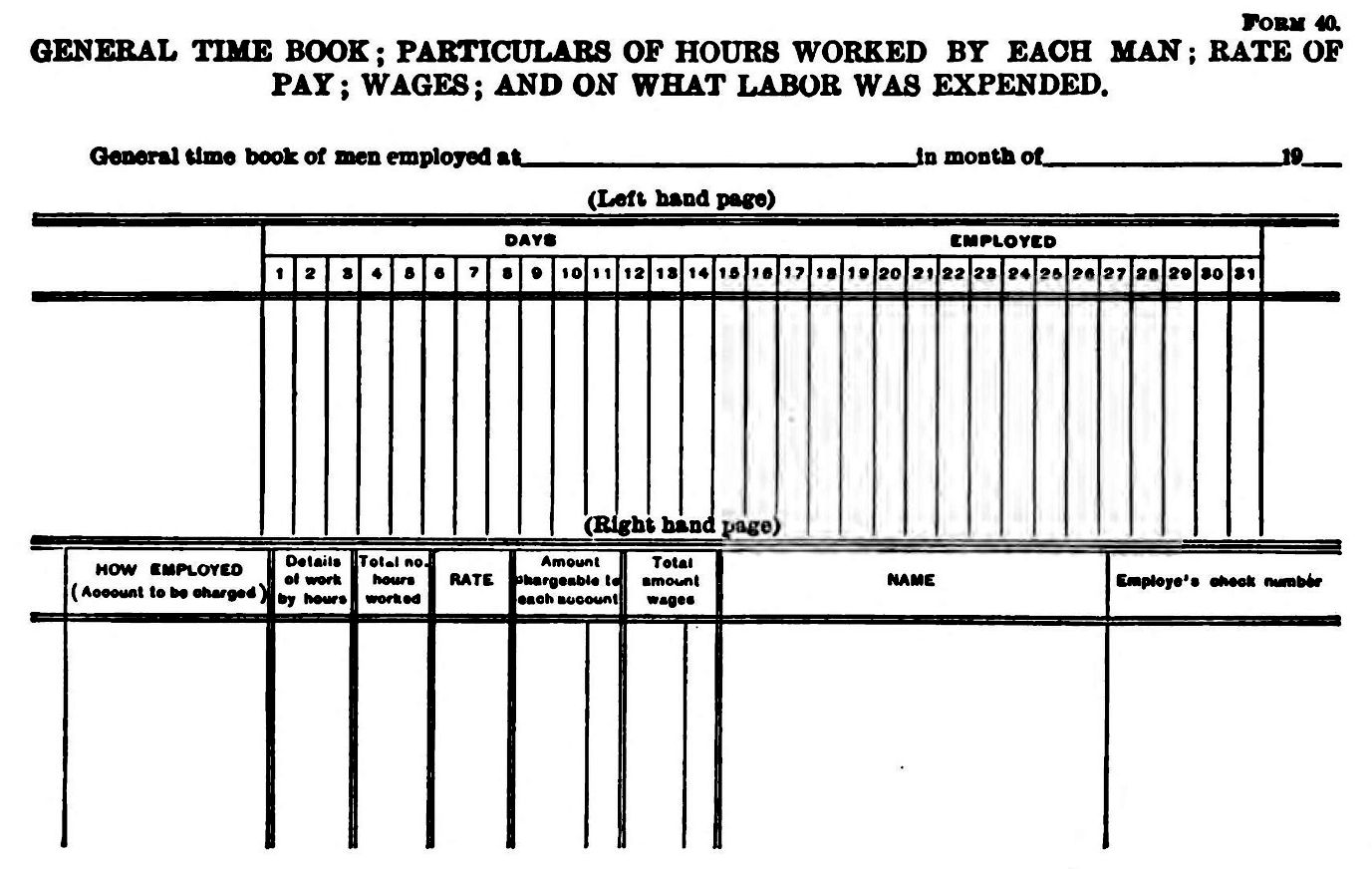
Railways, General Time Book, 1907

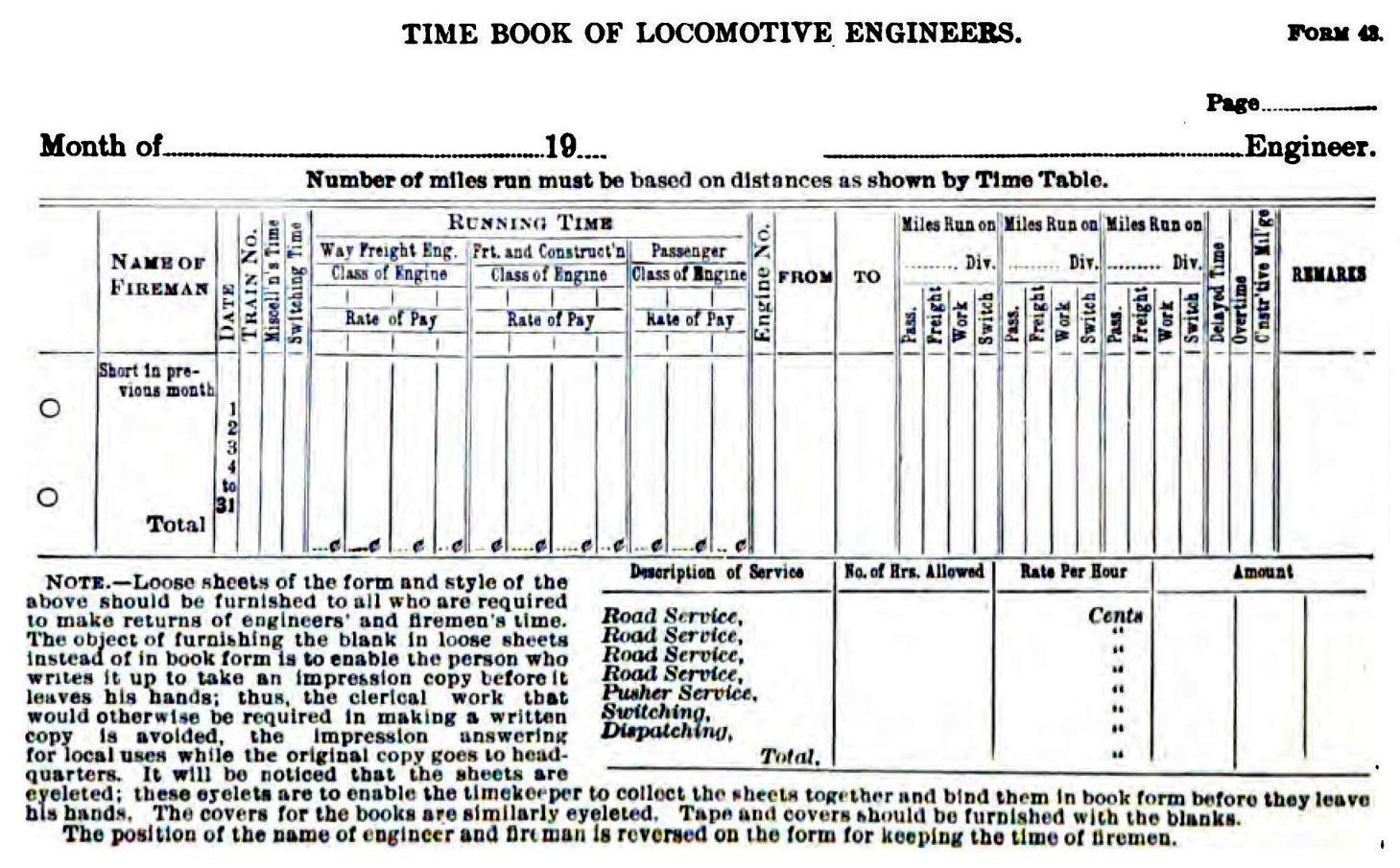
Time Book of Locomotive Engineers, 1907

A general time book should be kept by each foreman of the force he employs; it must be closed and sent forward to the proper officer on the first day of the month. Before sending it, however, the foreman should enter the amount on his "report of supplies received and expenses incurred," as already directed.

In Kirkman's system different people were involved in governing the labor practices in employing labour, keep up the time and make up the accounts. Kirkman first explained the theory of the subject, before taking up specific regulations necessary In handling the labor of a great corporation:

The amount that a railroad expends for labor is so great that the rendering of accurate returns in connection therewith, including the making of true and faithful pay rolls, is a matter of the utmost importance.
Wherever men are engaged, whether at shops, roundhouses, yards, warehouses, storehouses, depots of supply, upon the track, at stations, upon trains, or at any other place, intelligent provision must be made for keeping accurate, account of the time they work, whether the work is done by the hour, day, month or piece. Otherwise It cannot but follow that injustice will result, either to the employee or to the company....

And furthermore:

... the details (distribution) of each man's time should also pass through the hands of the local officials. These details are shown in the time book; this book should accompany or follow the pay roll.... The timebook is then ready for use in making the pay roll... The correctness of each time book should be formally certified by the timekeeper (i.e. person who makes it) as follows: 'I hereby certify that this time book is correct.' This certificate should be signed not only by the person who actually takes the time, but by the official who is immediately in charge; thus, at shops it should be.

In the 1907 revised edition of this work, Kirkman presented different specialized time books for Bridge and Building; for Freight Trainman; for Locomotive Engineers; for Passenger Trainman; and for Tracks.

=== Fully developed system becomes obsolete, first part 20th century ===
Early 20th century the time book has become a regular tool of management, sometimes in the shape of a loose leaf binder. The handling the labor accounts, however, keeps causing great difficulties as Kirkman (1907) explained, and therefor he introduced the track time book.:

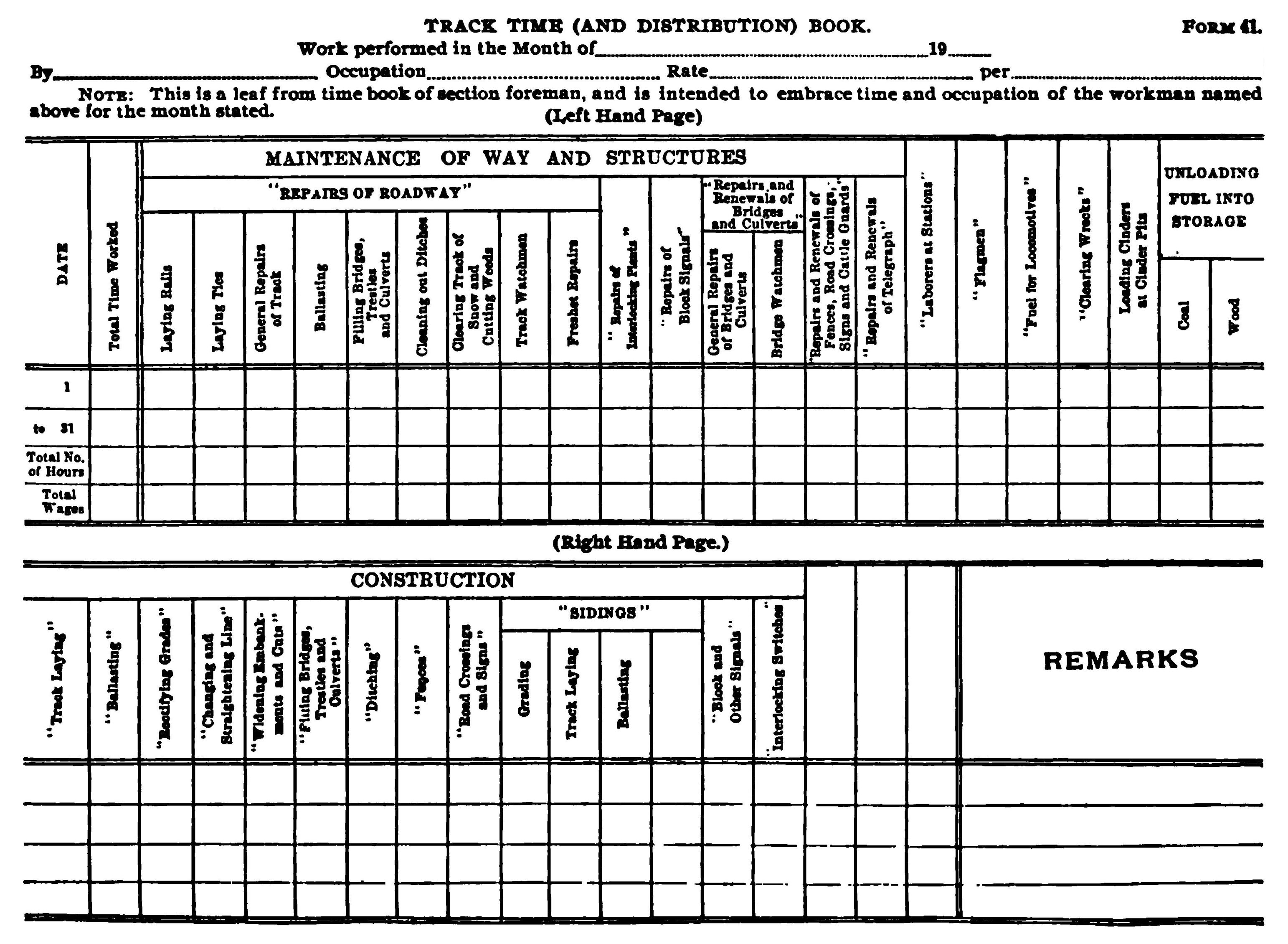
Track Time (and Distribution) Book, 1907.

In regard to handling the labor accounts for work performed by section foremen and others, there has been great difficulty experienced, not only in accurately ascertaining how much time each man works, but the class of work he has been engaged upon. The form of the track time book - very clearly shows both.* It has been in use many years, but has been amended from time to time, as experience and new things suggested Improvement. The main point in connection with it — as in the case of material — is that every section foreman can keep the account of work performed, and what it was performed on, with ease and little labor, leaving It to the accountants at headquarters to determine the cost and sum up the total.

And furthermore:

By reference to this time book it will be seen that the labor of section men can be apportioned to all the various operating, construction and other accounts that come within the compass of their duties and this with such facility that any section foreman can perform the clerical work accurately, and with so little time that it will take nothing practically from his daily duties. Thus, when the day is over, he will enter opposite the name of each man the total number of hours he has worked, and opposite that, under appropriate columns provided therefor, how many hours are chargeable to each of the various operating, construction or other accounts upon which the man has been engaged. Nothing could be more simple or more comprehensive.

In his 1908 Cost Keeping and Management Engineering Halbert Gillette presented a cost keeping system and its application to sewer work, which incorporated an advanced type of time book, which he called time sheet. Although the form was named time sheet, it was actually a fully developed time book, and not a modern time sheet. This system was in use at the Moore-Mansfield Construction Company and the Mansfield Engineering Company from Indianapolis, Indiana, an engineering designing and general contracting office. Gillette explained the system as follows:

The essential and fundamental feature of the system depends upon the form of the time sheet used (front view of time sheet (first image), and back view (second image)). The time sheet is folded when in use by the timekeeper and carried in a cover, making the same of book size, and practically the same form as the ordinary time book. On the left hand side of the front appears the time sheet in the usual form.

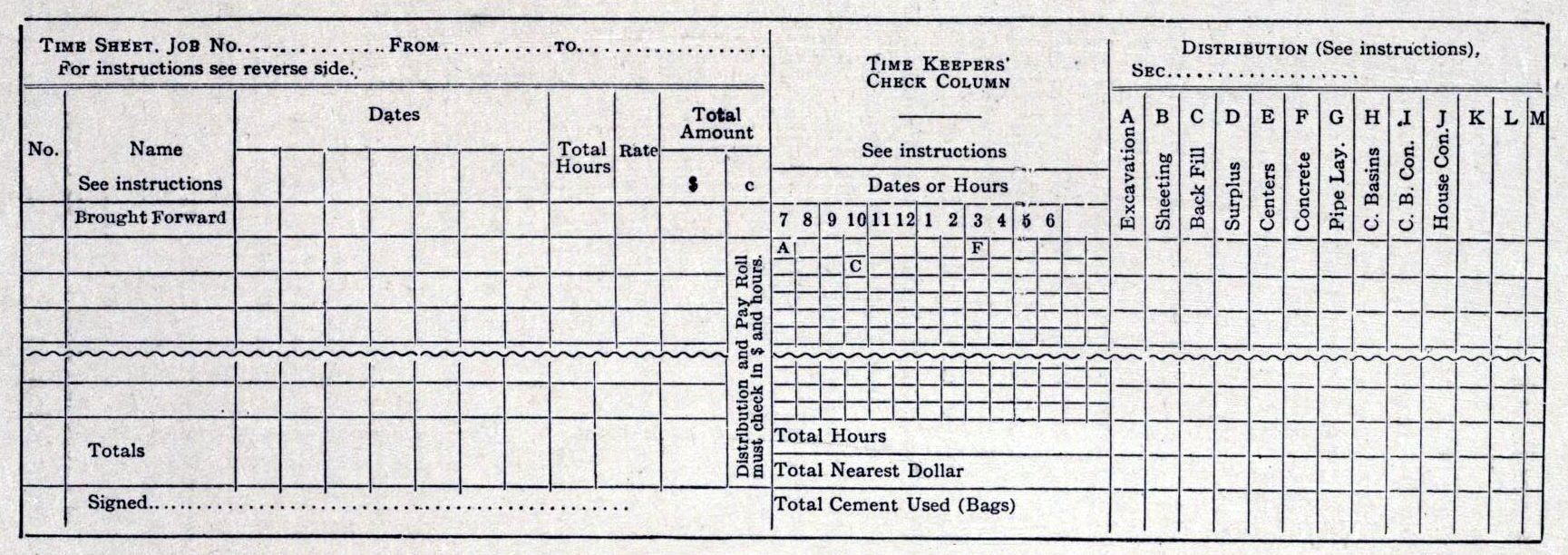
Time Sheet, front, 1909. (fig. 65)

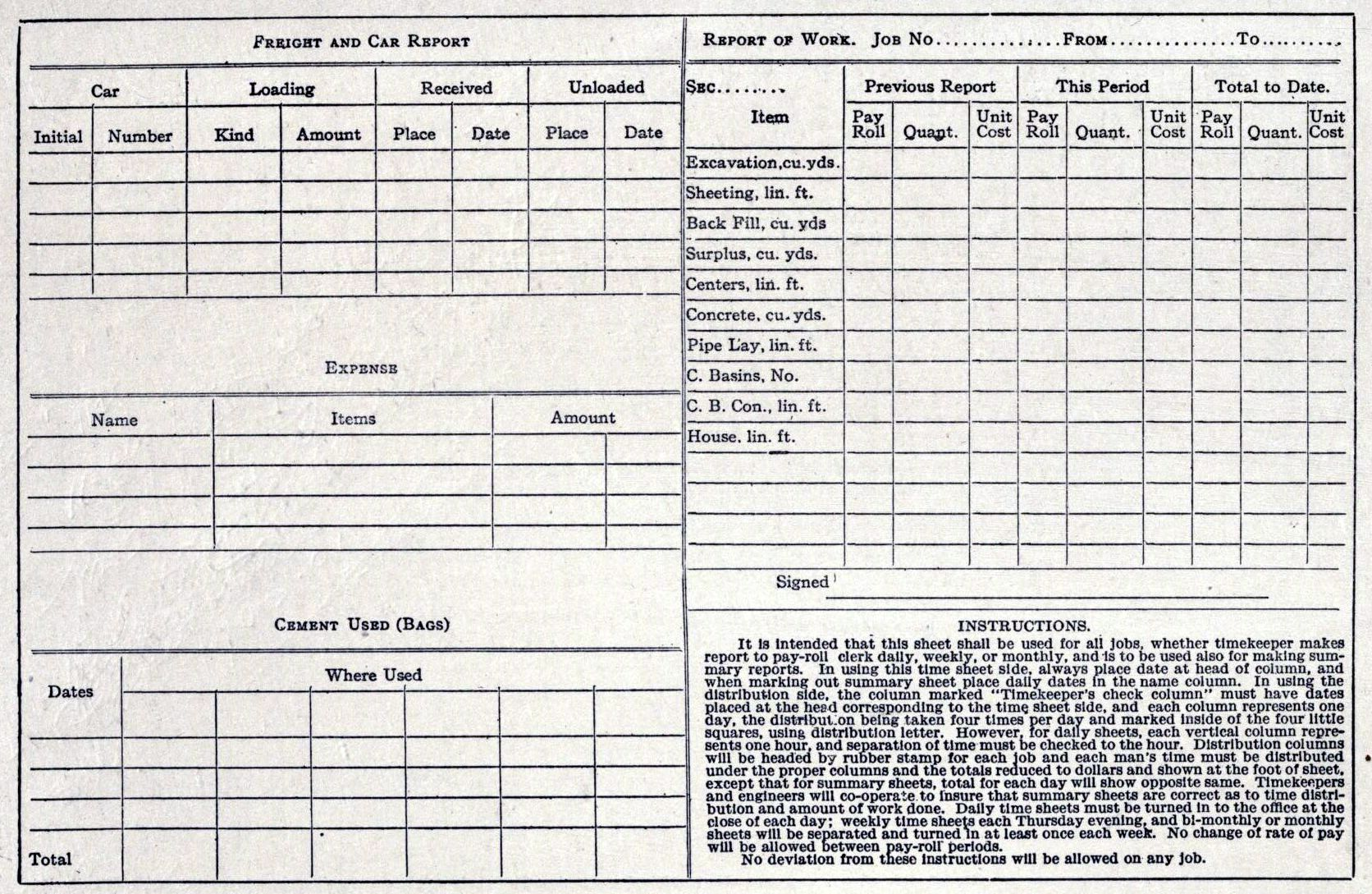
Time Sheet, back, 1909 (fig. 66)

This time sheet is arranged so that it may be used for a gang reporting time weekly, and is also used where the time sheet is turned in each day, in which latter case the lines under the column dates are ignored and the time placed in the total hour column. On the left hand side appears first the timekeeper's check column.
The instructions to the timekeeper on the back of the sheet (second image) are probably sufficiently clear, although it might be added that where the time sheet is used as a weekly report, as is generally the case, where the gang is small or where the work is unimportant, the time is checked and divided by means of the four squares under each date and opposite each name, each square thus representing one-fourth of a day.
In the case of the time sheet as illustrated, the distributions shown are for a sewer job and the particular distributions required are shown printed in by means of a rubber stamp. Each distribution thereby for this job shows a particular key letter although the same letter may not mean the same thing on any two jobs, but reference is made to the rubber stamp heading on each contract to determine the meaning of such letter...

This form of timekeeping would be of value because of the system of uniformity alone, even if no regard were given to the other features mentioned, although the above companies using this report are satisfied that they are securing more valuable data by this form than they would have ever been able to do by previous forms used. The value of the uniform time sheet lies in the education of the timekeepers, resulting in a more efficient working force. Under the old system with individual time sheets, prepared especially for each job, the forms of the time sheets were many and various, and, for this very reason timekeepers presumed to incorporate their own ideas and make changes and innovations, resulting in a bunch of data that required hours, and generally the personal attendance of the timekeepers, to work out.

Passing from the time sheets, (see figures) pay rolls, and the cost record book, the next feature of the system of information or cost data consists of progress charts. These of course, will vary with any job according to the character of same, and, as they are used by nearly every large construction company, it will only be necessary to say that blue prints are prepared (generally blue line prints) upon which the timekeeper is able to color in the work completed each day of the week, marking dates thereon and turning such charts into the office. These progress blue prints thus form a permanent record of the progress of the work and also form the basis for the determination of the amount of work accomplished from time to time.

In his 1913 Principles of factory cost keeping by Edward P. Moxey one chapter is devoted to "Accounting for Labour," whereby different Methods of Recording Time are described.

in the course of the 20th century the discipline of recording work time started to alter as the following quote from the dressmaking shop A. & L. Tirocchi in Providence, Rhode Island from 1915 to 1947 revealed:

Good payroll records are a necessity for any business. One of the fundamental types of record is the time book, with printed forms to record the hours worked by employees on a weekly basis. A. & L. Tirocchi did use these printed time books, probably purchased from an office supply store, but the bookkeeper generally only recorded the wage paid weekly, not the hours worked.

With the introduction of modern production control and standard cost accounting in the 1920s the traditional time books became obsolete, as Herman M. Grasselt (1925), an authority in the Paper Making trade, explained:

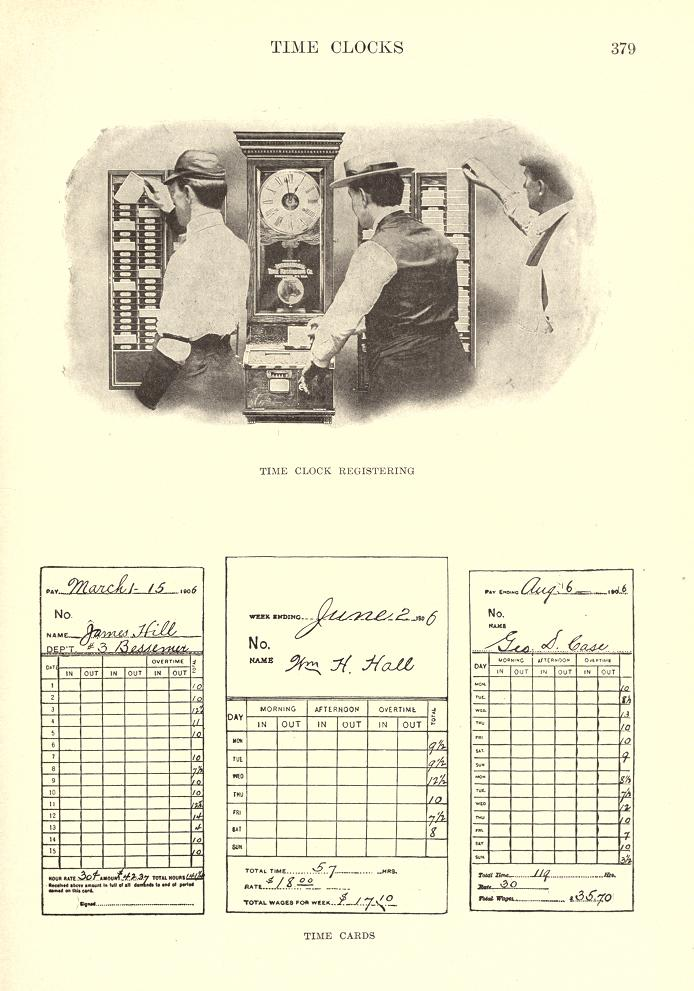
Time clock and In-and-Out Clock Cards, 1909

The old- fashioned time-book has no place in modern industry; time-recorder and individual weekly In-and-Out Clock Cards are the only proficient means to obtain accurate data. Each department is to be assigned a certain "block" of employees' clock numbers, with sufficient allowance for additions, according to the flow of operations. Within the respective departments, each employee receives a definite clock card number, which remains with him as long as he is in a certain department or with the company. The time cards are placed in "In and Out" racks beside the time.

In late 20th-century management systems a more limited registration of worktime remained, whereby the traditional time books were replaced by time sheets.

=== Limited use in second part of the 20th century ===
In the second part of the 20th century, time books didn't fully disappear. In his Construction Office Administration. Deatherage (1964) explained, that time books still had a limited use in his system of production control:

The author has worked out and put into practice on construction what is known as the Deatherage system of costing. The predominate [sic] feature is "one writing," the making of several records at one time so as to eliminate as far as possible any rewriting or reposting, using carbon-backed forms and the "visual- record system." Essentially this is the same "book system" used by the corner groceryman in keeping his individual customer accounts.

The Deatherage system of production control, etc., is used by some of the largest manufacturers in the nation in keeping piecework costs and also for inventory records, equipment records, etc. When this system is used, as with the corner grocer, the original entry for the record is always used, the balance or total being carried forward from the last transaction. Posted daily, the record of continuing totals on the tickets, whether it be labor or materials, is filed in the "visual file" so the previous day's totals and units are read directly by anyone interested. If you are running a charge account at the grocer's,

... This is equivalent to the foreman checking his men in the morning before work starts in his time book and allocating where the men are to work. The additional function is that he has to write down where his men are instead of neglecting this until the end of the shift then trying to remember where he had the men during the day for the purpose of making out his foreman's report, at which time he guesses at it.

Another example was the use of time and wages book in Australia. The Commonwealth Court of Conciliation and Arbitration (1967) explained:

Except where mechanical timing devices are used for the purposes of recording starting times and finishing times of employees, each employer shall provide a time book or time sheet in which shall be entered the employee's name and classification. The employer shall cause to be entered each day in the time book or time sheet each day's starting and finishing times, the times allowed for meals, each day's hours of work of each employee and the wages received each week (including overtime and other payments). Such entries shall at least once a week be certified by the employee as a true record of the time worked if he is so satisfied and shall be vouched for by the signature of the employer or his representative or manager.

It shall be a breach of this award if any person knowingly makes, certifies or vouches for a false entry in such time book or time sheet.

Where mechanical timing devices are used for the purposes of recording starting and finishing times of employees, each employer shall keep a record from which can be readily ascertained the name and classification of each employee, the hours worked each day and the wages received each week (including overtime and other payments)... Time books, time sheets or mechanical records shall be kept for at least 3 years after they have been completed.

This system is similar with the contemporary use of time sheets.

=== Nowadays ===
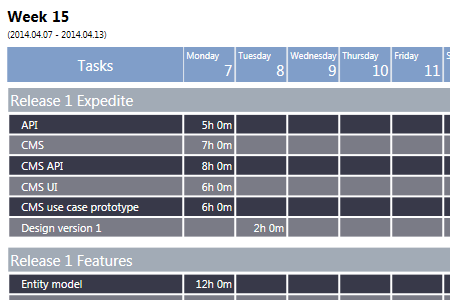
Contemporary time sheet

Nowadays the time book can be a part of an integrated payroll system. In small businesses sometimes time books are used as attendance book, to register the time employees work. They can be used as alternative for a time clock at the entrance of a company, where employees check in. Another system is the time sheet, a form where employees fill in the hours worked.

== See also ==
- Payroll
- Production control
- Time clock
- Time management
- Timesheet
- Working time
