= Lingan S. Randolph =

American engineer (1859-1922)

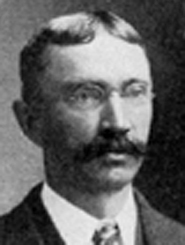
Lingan S. Randolph

Lingan Strother Randolph (May 13, 1859 – March 7, 1922) was an American mechanical and consulting engineer, and Professor of Mechanical Engineering from 1893 to 1918 at Virginia Tech.

== Life and work ==
Born in Martinsburg, Virginia to James Lingan and Emily Strother, he attended the Shenandoah Valley Academy from 1873 to 1876. After a year at the Virginia Military Institute, he moved to the Stevens Institute of Technology, where he graduated in mechanical engineer in 1883.

Randolph started his career working for various railroads as test engineer and made it superintendent of motive power of the Cumberland and Pennsylvania Railroad. In 1893 he was appointed Professor of Mechanical Engineering from 1893 at Virginia Tech, where he retired in 1918. From 1902 to 1913 he had also been Head of the department of Mechanical Engineering, and from 1913 to 1918 Dean of the Department of Engineering. Randolph was Member of the American Society of Civil Engineers since his election on May 2, 1888.

In the 1895 article "The Economic Element in Technical Education," Randolph advocated "the discussion of the commercial side of engineering problems, and the undesirability of making computations to an unnecessary degree of precision."

At Virginia Tech there is the Randolph Hall named after him and there is a L.S. Randolph chair for mechanical engineer.

== Selected publications ==
- Randolph, L. S. "Cost of Lubricating Car Journals." Transactions of the American Society of Mechanical Engineers Vol XI., (1894). p. 126
- Randolph, L. S. "Discussion of" Painting of Iron Structures Exposed to Weather"." Transactions of the American Society of Civil Engineers 33.1 (1895).
- Randolph, L. S. "Requirements for Degrees in Engineering Courses." in Engineering Education, 1901, p. 159-179
- Randolph, L. S. "The economic element in technical education." SPEE Proceedings 3 (1895): 181-188.
- L.S. Randolph. "Virginia Anthracite Coal Fields." Mining Magazine. Vol. 10, 1904, p. 428
- L.S. Randolph. "The Possibilities of Engineering Education," in: The Stevens Indicator, Vol. 23. Jan. 1906. p. 1-5.
