= Production control =

Technique in supply chain management

Within supply chain management and manufacturing, production control is the activity of monitoring and controlling any particular production or operation. Production control is often run from a specific control room or operations room. With inventory control and quality control, production control is one of the key functions of operations management.

== Overview ==
Production control is the activity of monitoring and controlling a large physical facility or physically dispersed service. It is a "set of actions and decision taken during production to regulate output and obtain reasonable assurance that the specification will be met." The American Production and Inventory Control Society, nowadays APICS, defined production control in 1959 as:

Production control is the task of predicting, planning and scheduling work, taking into account manpower, materials availability and other capacity restrictions, and cost so as to achieve proper quality and quantity at the time it is needed and then following up the schedule to see that the plan is carried out, using whatever systems have proven satisfactory for the purpose.

Production planning and control in larger factories is often run from a production planning department run by production controllers and a production control manager. Production monitoring and control of larger operations is often run from a central space, called a control room or operations room or operations control center (OCC).

The emerging area of Project Production Management (PPM), based on viewing project activities as a production system, adopts the same notion of production control to take steps to regulate the behavior of a production system where in this case the production system is a capital project, rather than a physical facility or a physically dispersed service.

Production control is to be contrasted with project controls. As explained, project controls have developed to become centralized functions to track project progress and identify deviations from plan and to forecast future progress, using metrics rooted in accounting principles.

== Types ==
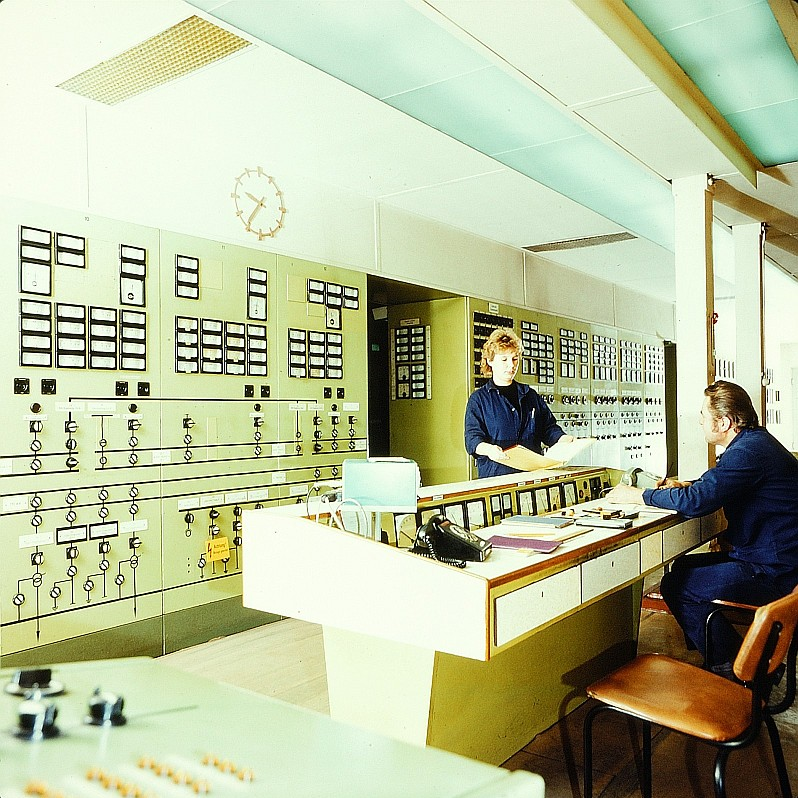
Powerplant control room, 1983

One type of production control is the control of manufacturing operations.

- Production planning and control of the when and where.
- Production control and supply chain management

Management of real-time operational in specific fields.

- Production control in the television studio in a production control room
- Master control in television studio
- Production control in spaceflight in a Mission Operations Control Room

Communist countries had a central production control institute, where the agricultural and industrial production for the whole nation was planned and controlled.

In Customer Care environments production control is known as Workforce Management (WFM). Centralized Workforce Management teams are often called Command Center, Mission Control or WFM Shared Production Centers.

== Related types of control in organizations ==
Production control is just one of multiple types of control in organizations. Most commons other types are:

- Management control, one of the managerial functions like planning, organizing, staffing and directing. It is an important function because it helps to check the errors and to take the corrective action so that deviation from standards are minimized and stated goals of the organization are achieved in a desired manner.
- Inventory control, the supervision of supply, storage and accessibility of items in order to ensure an adequate supply without excessive oversupply.
- Quality control, the process by which entities review the quality of all factors involved in production.

== See also ==
- Control (management)
- Industrial engineering
- Manufacturing process management
- Materials management
- Operations management
- Production engineering
- Project production management
- Time book
