= Machine shop =

Room, building or company where machining is done

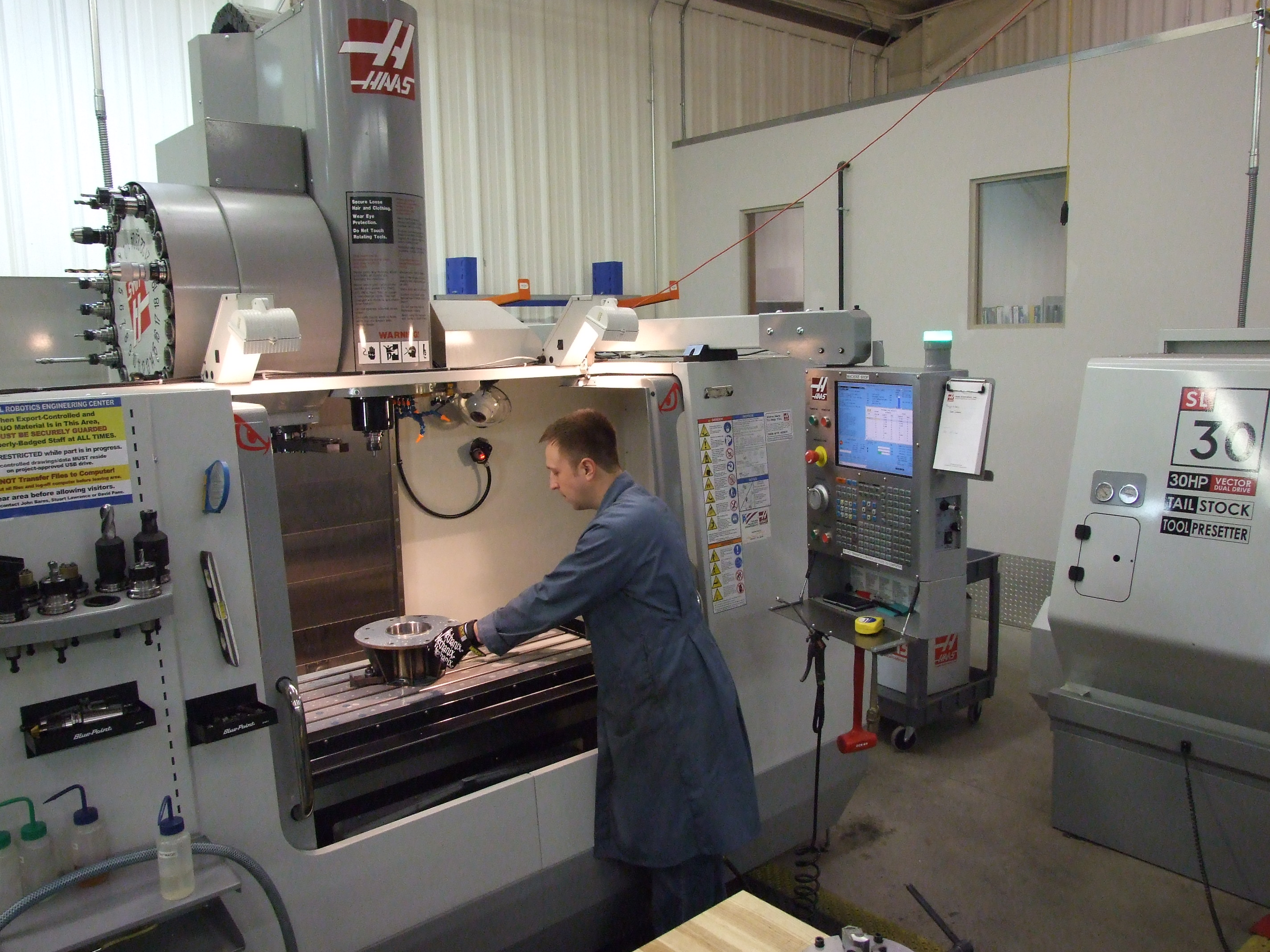
Modern machine shop workstation, 2009.

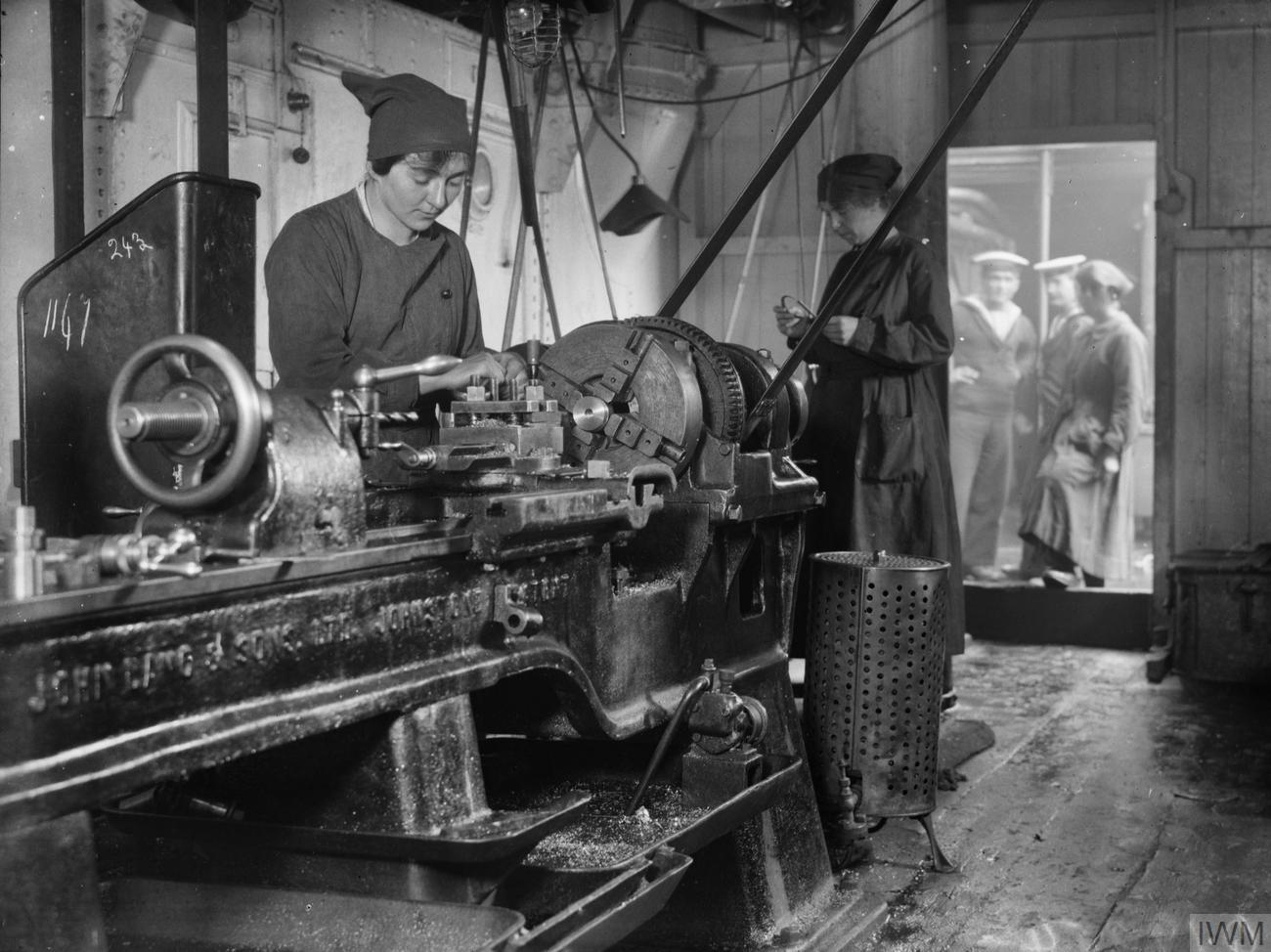
A machinist operating a lathe aboard HMS Apollo during World War I

A machine shop or engineering workshop is a room, building, or company where machining, a form of subtractive manufacturing, is done. In a machine shop, machinists use machine tools and cutting tools to make parts, usually of metal or plastic (but sometimes of other materials such as glass or wood). A machine shop can be a small business (such as a job shop) or a portion of a factory, whether a toolroom or a production area for manufacturing. The building construction and the layout of the place and equipment vary, and are specific to the shop; for instance, the flooring in one shop may be concrete, or even compacted dirt, and another shop may have asphalt floors. A shop may be air-conditioned or not; but in other shops it may be necessary to maintain a controlled climate. Each shop has its own tools and machinery which differ from other shops in quantity, capability and focus of expertise.

The parts produced can be the end product of the factory, to be sold to customers in the machine industry, the car industry, the aircraft industry, or others. It may encompass the frequent machining of customized components. In other cases, companies in those fields have their own machine shops.

The production can consist of cutting, shaping, drilling, finishing, and other processes, frequently those related to metalworking. The machine tools typically include metal lathes, milling machines, machining centers, multitasking machines, drill presses, or grinding machines, many controlled with computer numerical control (CNC). Other processes, such as heat treating, electroplating, or painting of the parts before or after machining, are often done in a separate facility.

A machine shop can contain some raw materials (such as bar stock for machining) and an inventory of finished parts. These items are often stored in a warehouse. The control and traceability of the materials usually depend on the company's management and the industries that are served, standard certification of the establishment, and stewardship.

A machine shop can be a capital intensive business, because the purchase of equipment can require large investments. A machine shop can also be labour-intensive, especially if it is specialized in repairing machinery on a job production basis, but production machining (both batch production and mass production) is much more automated than it was before the development of CNC, programmable logic control (PLC), microcomputers, and robotics. It no longer requires masses of workers, although the jobs that remain tend to require high talent and skill. Training and experience in a machine shop can both be scarce and valuable.

Methodology, such as the practice of 5S, the level of compliance over safety practices and the use of personal protective equipment by the personnel, as well as the frequency of maintenance to the machines and how stringent housekeeping is performed in a shop, may vary widely from one shop to another.

== History ==
=== Until the 19th century ===
The first machine shops started to appear in the 19th century when the Industrial Revolution was already long underway. Before the industrial revolution parts and tools were produced in workshops in local villages and cities on small-scale often for a local market. The first machinery that made possible the Industrial Revolution were also developed in similar workshops.

The production machines in the first factories were built on site, where every part was still individually made to fit. After some time those factories started their own workshops, where parts of the existing machinery were repaired or modified. In those days textiles were the dominant industry, and these industries started to further develop their own machine tools.

=== 19th century ===
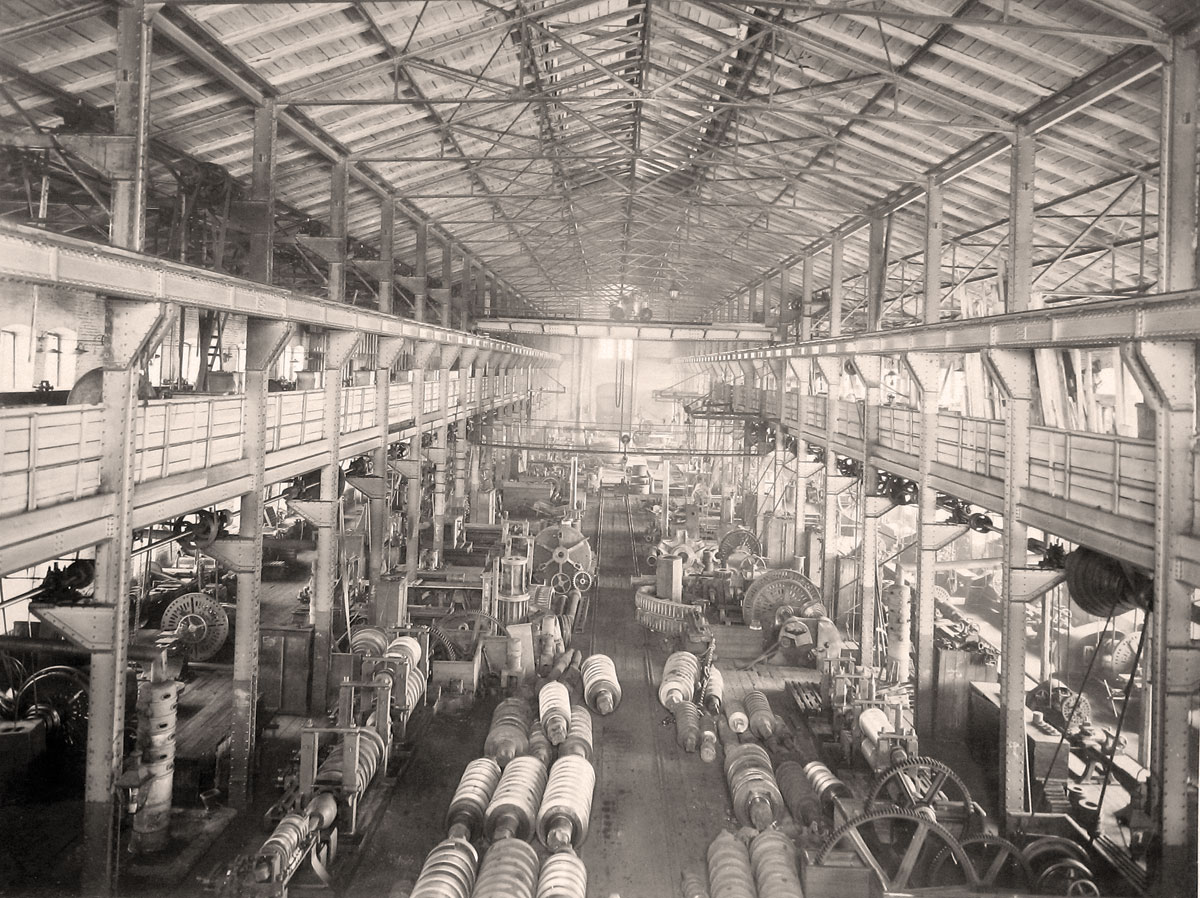
Late 19th-century machine shop

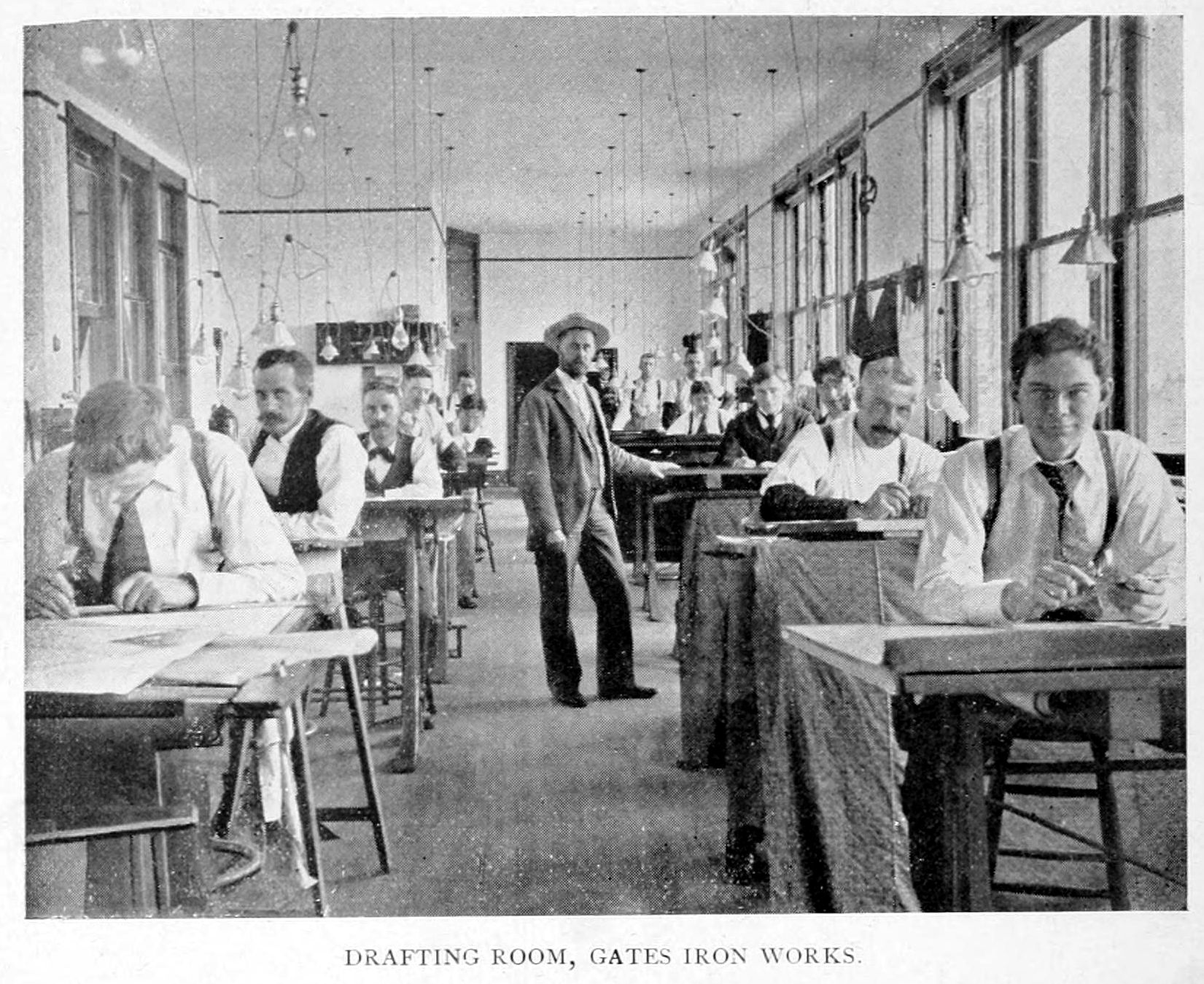
Gates Iron Works, Drafting Room, 1896

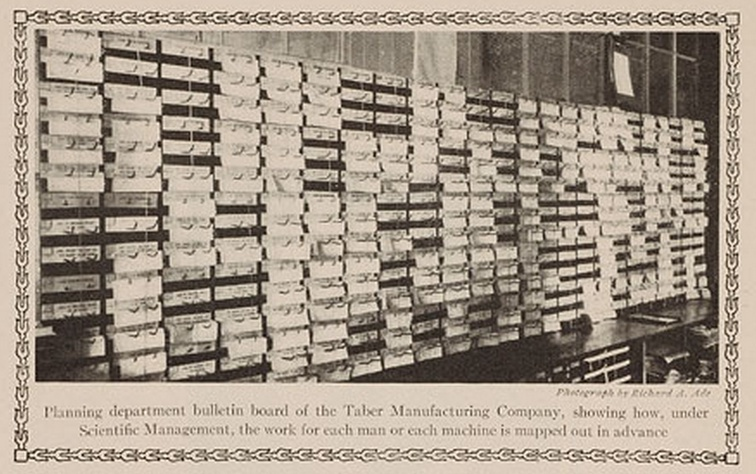
Planning department bulletin, showing how the work for each man or each machine in the machine shop is mapped out in advance, 1911.

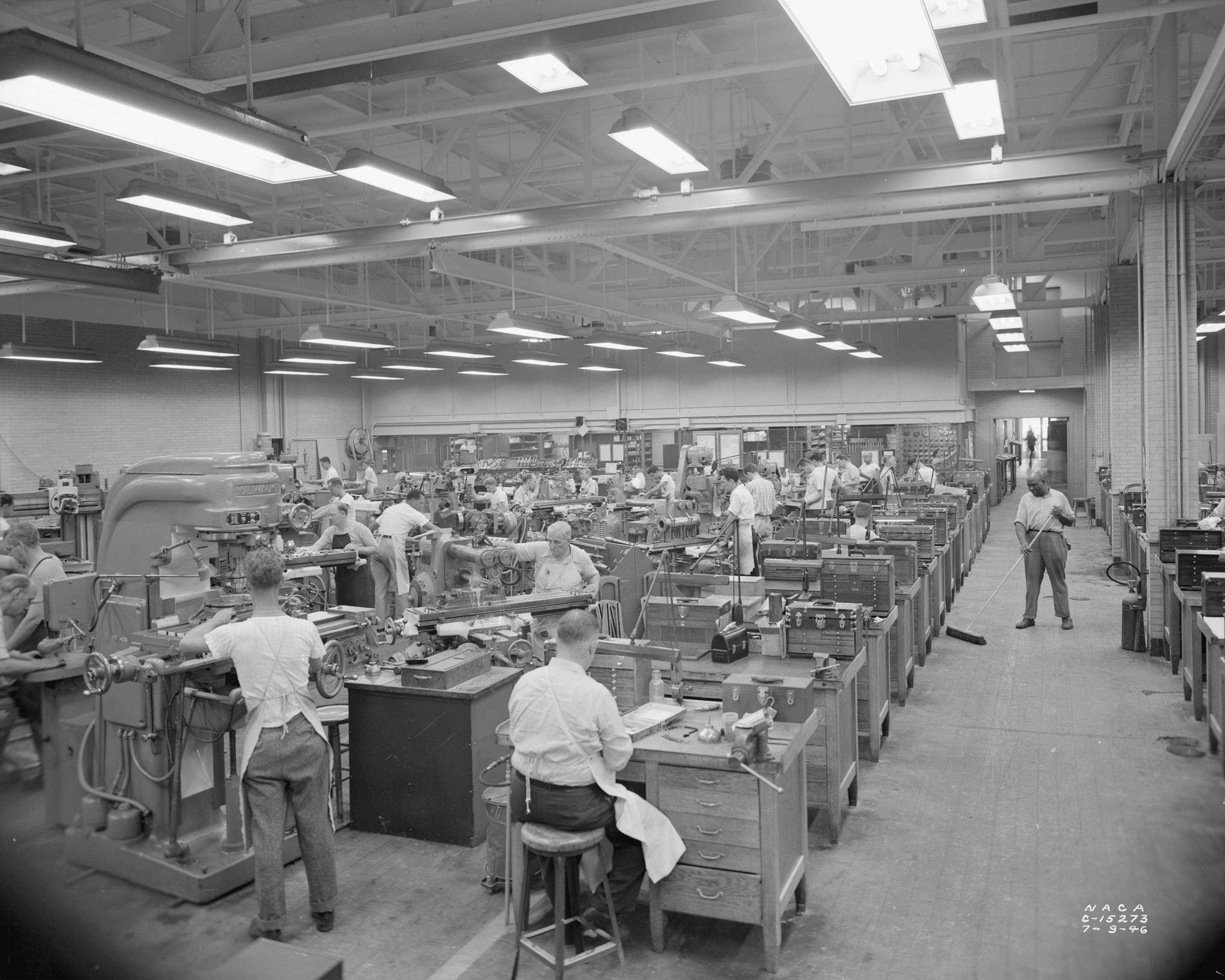
Machinists and toolmakers making experimental engine parts at the Aircraft Engine Research Laboratory, 1946.

Further development early in the 19th century in England, Germany and Scotland of machine tools and cheaper methods for the production of steel, such as the Bessemer steel, triggered the Second Industrial Revolution, which culminated in early factory electrification, mass production and the production line. The machine shop emerged as Burghardt called, a "place in which metal parts are cut to the size required and put together to form mechanical units or machines, the machines so made to be used directly or indirectly in the production of the necessities and luxuries of civilization."

The rise of machine shops and their specific manufacturing and organizational problems triggered the early job shop management pioneers, whose theories became known as scientific management. One of the earliest publications in this field was Horace Lucian Arnold, who in 1896 wrote a first series of articles about "Modern Machine-Shop Economics." This work stretched out from production technology, production methods and factory lay out to time studies, production planning, and machine shop management. A series of publications on these topics would follow. In 1899 Joshua Rose published the book Modern machine-shop practice, about the operation, construction, and principles of shop machinery, steam engines, and electrical machinery.

=== 20th century ===
In 1903 the Cyclopedia of Modern Shop Practice was published with Howard Monroe Raymond as Editor-in-Chief, and in the same year Frederick Winslow Taylor published his Shop management; a paper read before the American society of mechanical engineers. New York. Taylor had started his workmanship as a machine-shop laborer at Midvale Steel Works in 1878, and worked his way up to machine shop foreman, research director, and finally chief engineer of the works. As an independent consulting engineer one of his first major assignments was in 1898 at Bethlehem Steel was to solve an expensive machine-shop capacity problem.

In 1906 Oscar E. Perrigo published the popular book Modern machine shop, construction the equipment and management of machine shops. The first part of Modern machine shop, Perrigo (1906) focussed on the physical construction of the building and presented a model machine shop. With this model machine shop, Perrigo explored the way the space in factories could be organized. This was not uncommon in his days. Many industrial engineers, like Alexander Hamilton Church, J. Slater Lewis, Hugo Diemer etc., published plans for some new industrial complex.

These works among others cumulated in the scientific management movement on which Taylor in 1911 wrote his famous The Principles of Scientific Management, a seminal text of modern organization and decision theory, with a significant part dedicated to the organization of machine shops. The introduction of new cutting materials as high-speed steel, and better organization of the production by implementing new scientific management methods such as planning boards (see image), significantly improved machine shop productivity and efficiency of machine shops. In the course of the 20th century, these further increased with the further development of technology.

In the early 20th century, the power for the machine tools was still supplied by a mechanical belt, which was powered by a central steam engine. In the course of the 20th-century electric motors took over the power supply of the machine tools.

As materials and chemical substances, including cutting oil, become more sophisticated, the awareness of the impact on the environment slowly grew. In parallel to the acknowledgment of the ever-present reality of accidents and potential occupational injury, the sorting of scrap materials for recycling and the disposal of refuse evolved in an area related to the environment, safety, and health. In regulated machine shops this would turn into a constant practice supported by what would be a discipline known as EHS (for environment, health, and safety), or of a similar name, such as HQSE that would include quality assurance.

In the second part of the 20th century, automation started with numerical control (NC) automation, and computer numerical control (CNC).

Digital instruments for quality control and inspection become widely available, and the utilization of lasers for precision measurements became more common for the larger shops that can afford the equipment.

Further integration of information technology into machine tools lead to the beginning of computer-integrated manufacturing. Production design and production became integrated into CAD/CAM, and production control became integrated in enterprise resource planning.

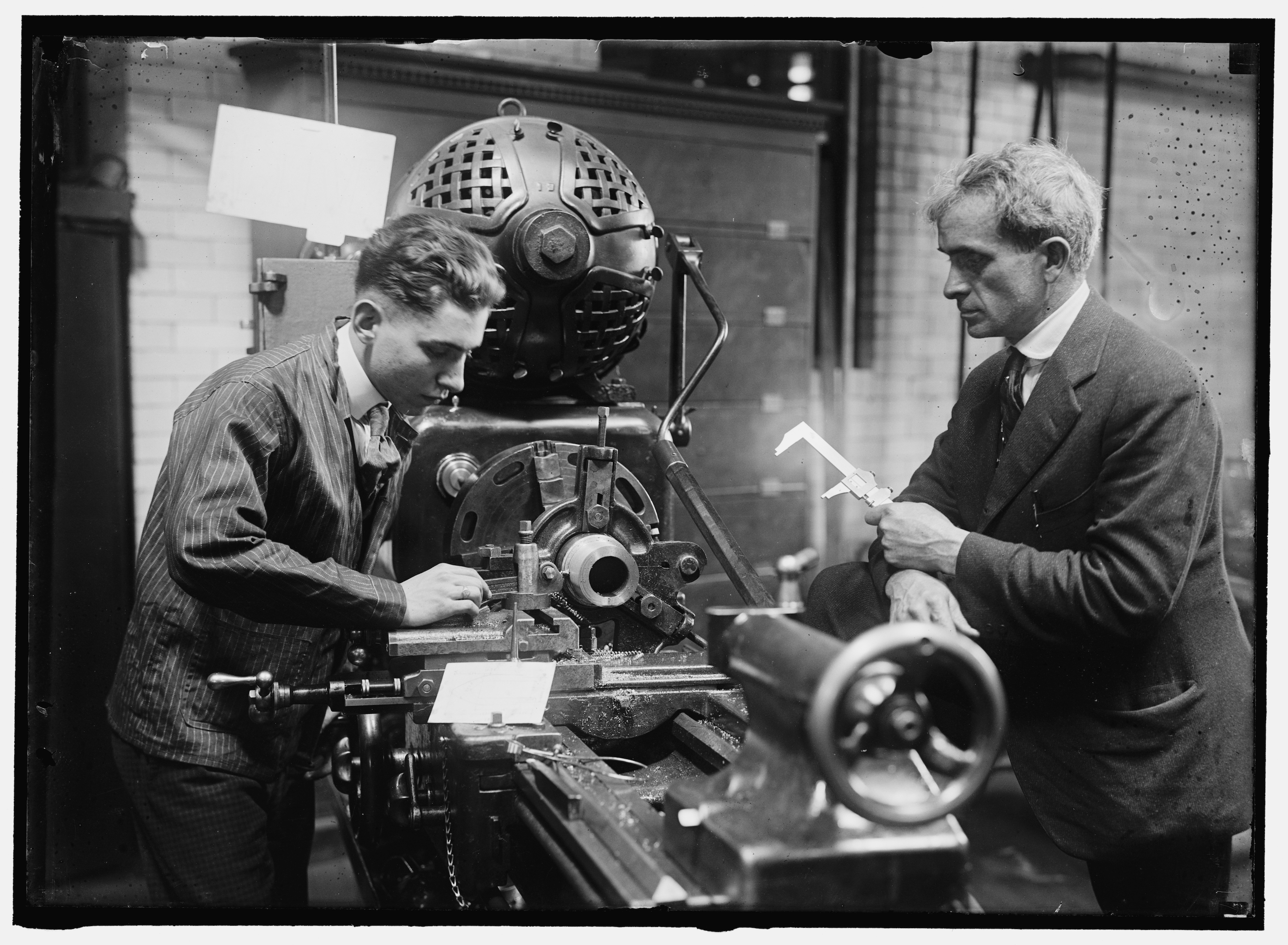
A trainee machinist and his supervisor work in a machine shop in 1917. Note the "professional" dress, which would likely be superseded by more practical clothing in a modern setting due to the risk of entanglement within machinery.

=== 21st century ===
In the late of the 20th century, the introduction of industrial robots further increased factory automation. Typical applications of robots include welding, painting, assembly, pick and place (such as packaging, palletizing and SMT), product inspection, and testing. As a result of this introduction the machine shop also "has been modernized to the extent that robotics and electronic controls have been introduced into the operation and control of machines. For small machine shops, though, having robots is more of an exception.

== Machine shop topics ==
=== Machines ===
A machine is a tool containing one or more parts that uses energy to perform an intended action. Machines are usually powered by mechanical, chemical, thermal, or electrical means, and are often motorized. Historically, a power tool also required moving parts to classify as a machine. However, the advent of electronics has led to the development of power tools without moving parts that are considered machines.

=== Machining ===
Machining is any of the various processes in which a piece of raw material is cut into a desired final shape and size by a controlled material-removal process. The many processes that have this common theme, controlled material removal, are today collectively known as subtractive manufacturing, in distinction from processes of controlled material addition, which are known as additive manufacturing. Exactly what the "controlled" part of the definition implies can vary, but it almost always implies the use of machine tools (in addition to just power tools and hand tools).

Though not all machine shops may have a CNC milling center, commonly, they may have access to a manual milling machine.

=== Machine tools ===
A machine tool is a machine for shaping or machining metal or other rigid materials, usually by cutting, boring, grinding, shearing, or other forms of deformation. Machine tools employ some sort of tool that does the cutting or shaping. All machine tools use some means of constraining the workpiece and provide a guided movement of the parts of the machine. Thus the relative movement between the workpiece and the cutting tool is controlled or constrained by the machine to at least some extent, rather than being entirely "offhand" or "freehand".

==== Cutting tools ====
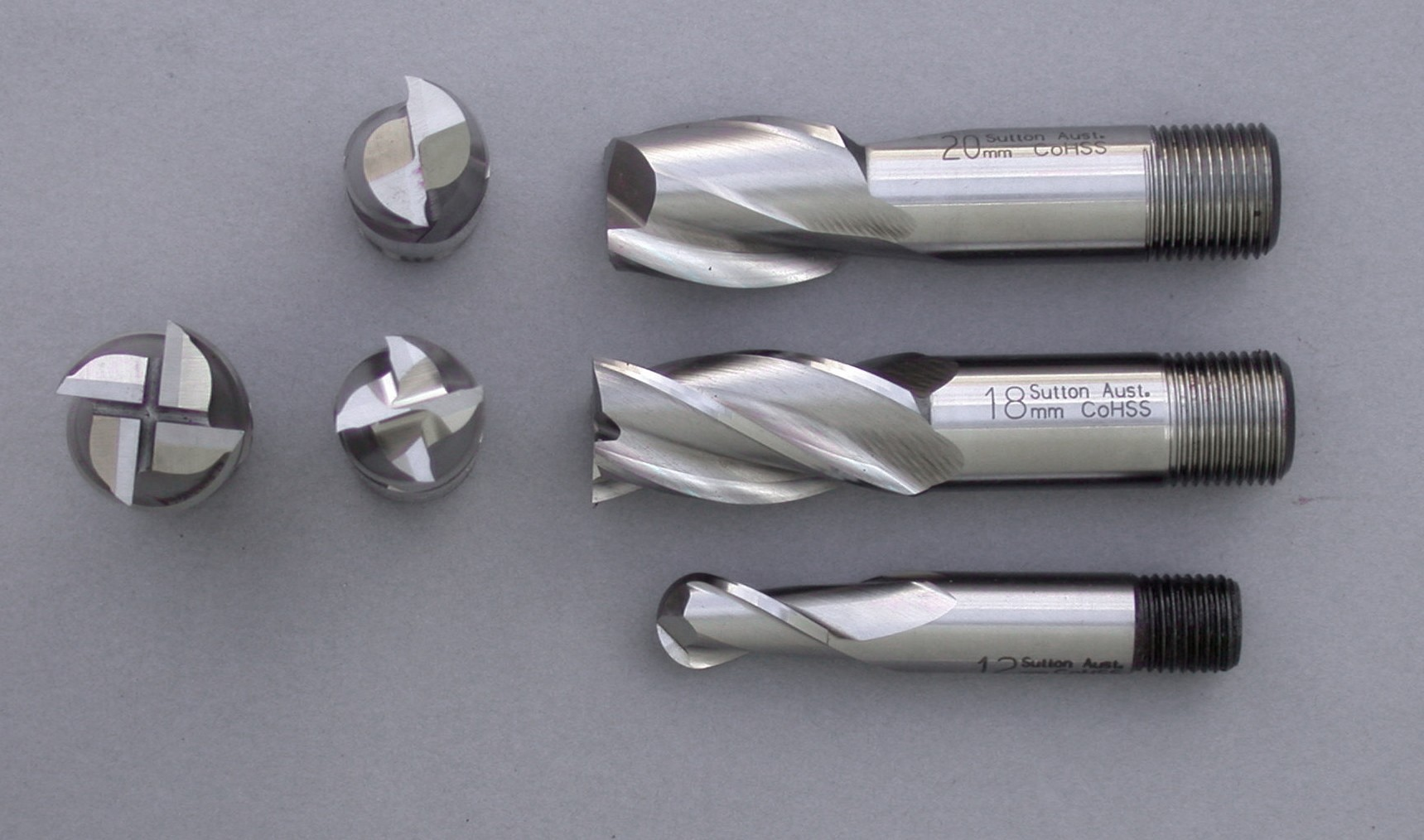
Milling cutters of different sizes and profiles.

Professional management of the inventory of cutting tools occurs mainly in larger operations. Smaller machine shops may have a more limited assortment of endmills, keyseat cutters, inserts, and other cutting tools. The choice in the sophistication of the design of the cutting tool, including material and finish, commonly depends on the job and the price of the cutting tool. In some instances, the cost of custom-made tools could be prohibitive for a small shop.

Depending on the industry and demands of the job, a cutting tool may only be used on a certain type of material, that is, a cutting tool may not contact another workpiece made of different chemical composition.

Not all machine shops are equipped with a mill and not all machine shops are aimed to do milling work.

=== Housekeeping ===
Some machine shops are better organized than others, and some places are kept cleaner than other establishments. In some instances, the shop is swept minutes before the end of every shift, and in other cases, there's no schedule or routine, or the cycle for sweeping and cleaning is more relaxed.

When it comes to machines, in some places the care and maintenance of the equipment are paramount, and the swarf (commonly known as chips) produced after parts have been machined, are removed daily, and then the machine is air-blown and wiped clean; while in other machine shops, the chips are left in the machines until is an absolute necessity to remove them; the second instance is not advisable.

==== Recycling ====
The remanent or residue of materials used, such as aluminum, steel, and oil, among others, can be gathered and recycled, and commonly, it may be sold. However, not all machine shops practice recycling, and not all have personnel dedicated to enforcing the habit of separating and keeping materials separated. In larger and organized operations, such responsibility may be delegated to the Health, Safety, Environment, and Quality (HSEQ) department.

=== Inspection ===
See Category:Metalworking measuring instruments

Quality assurance, quality control and inspection, are terms commonly used interchangeably. The accuracy and precision to be attained depends on several determining factors. Since not all machines have the same level of reliability and capability to execute predictable finished results within certain tolerances, nor all manufacturing processes achieve the same range of exactness, the machine shop is then limited to its own dependability in delivering the desire outcomes. Subsequently, subject to the rigor declared by the customer, the machine shop may be required to undergo a verification and validation even prior to the issuance and acknowledgment of an order.

The machine shop may have a specific area established for measuring and inspecting the parts in order to confirm compliance, while other shops only rely on the inspections performed by the machinists and fabricators. For instance, in some shops, a granite, calibrated surface plate may be shared by different departments, and in other shops, the lathes, the mills, etc., may have their own, or may not have one at all.

==== Calibration ====
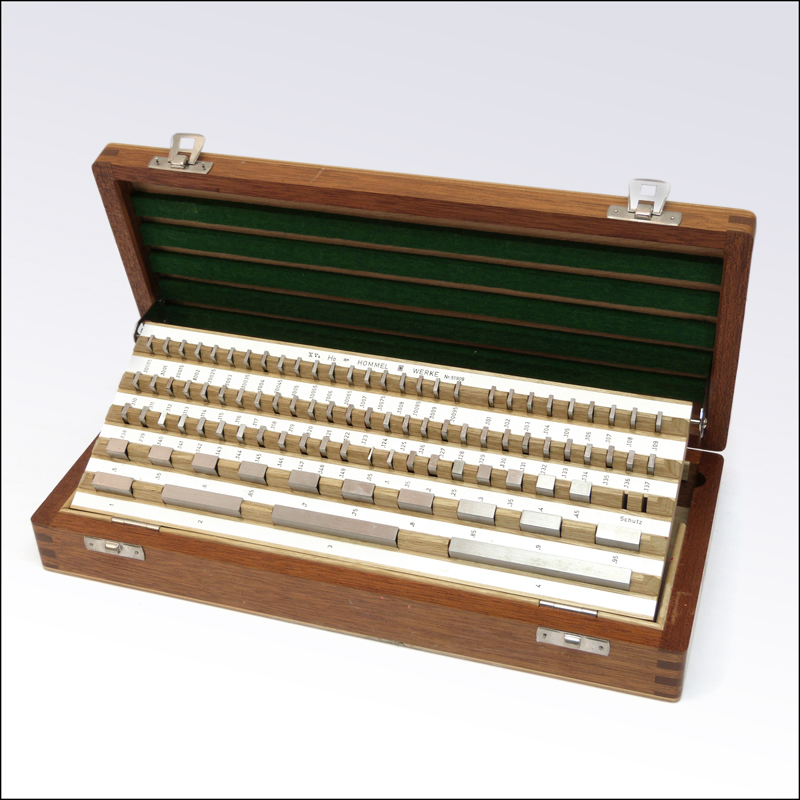
A set of Imperial gauge blocks.

The standards followed, the industry served, quality control, and mainly the type of practices in the machine shop, will denote the utilization of precision inspection instruments, and the accuracy of metrology employed. This means that not all machine shops implement a periodic interval for calibrating measuring devices. Not all machine shops have the same type of measuring instruments, though it is common to find micrometers, Vernier calipers, granite surface plates, among others.

The frequency and precision for calibrating metrology instruments may vary and it may require hiring the services of a specialized third-party. Also, in some instances, maintaining all instruments existent in the shop calibrated may be a requirement to not fall out of compliance.

=== Layout ===
The location and orientation of the machines are important. Preferably, some prior thought has been given in the positioning of the equipment; likely not as meticulously as in a plant layout study, the closeness of the machines, the types of machines, were the raw material are received and kept, as well as other factors, including ventilation, are taken in account to establish the initial layout of the machine shop. A routing diagram and daily operations may dictate the need to rearrange.

Profitability is commonly a driving consideration in regards to maximizing production, and thus aligning the machines in an effective manner; however, other critical factors must be considered, such as the preventive maintenance of the equipment and safety in the workplace. For instance, allowing room for a technician to maneuver behind the machining center to inspect connections, and not placing the machine where it would block the emergency exit.

=== Storage rooms and tool cribs ===
Some shops have cages or rooms dedicated to keeping certain tools or supplies; for instance, a room may be dedicated to only welding supplies, gas tanks, etcetera; or where janitorial supplies or other consumables such as grinding disks are stored. Depending on the size of the operation, management, and controls, these areas may be restricted and locked, or these could be staffed by an employee, as by a tool crib attendant; in other instances, the storage rooms or cages are accessible to all personnel. Not all shops have a tool crib or storage room(s) though, and in many cases, a large cabinet suffices.

=== Hand tools ===
Also, the way hand tools are stored and are made available to the fabricator or operators depends on how the shop functions or is managed. In many cases, common hand tools are visible in the work area and at reach for anyone. In many cases, the workers do not need to provide their own tools since the daily tools are available and provided, but in many other cases, the workers bring their own tools and toolboxes to their workplace

=== Safety ===
Safety is a consideration that needs to be observed and enforced daily and constantly; however, a shop may vary from other shops in strictness and thoroughness when it comes to the actual practice, policies implemented and overall seriousness ascertained by the personnel and management. In an effort to standardize some common guidelines, in the United States, the Occupational Safety and Health Administration (OSHA) issues didactic material and enforces precautions with the goal of preventing accidents.

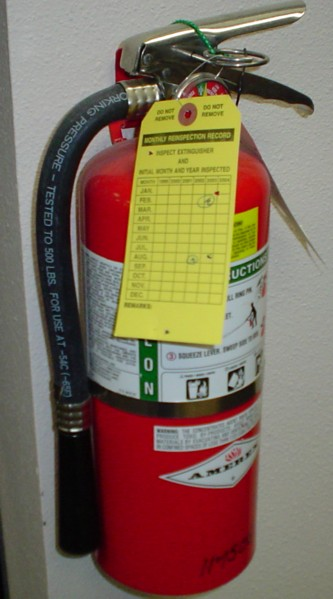
Fire extinguishers are a common requirement in a machine shop, and need to be inspected regularly.

In a machine shop usually, there are numerous practices that are known in relation to working safely with machines. Some of the common practices include:

- Wear appropriate personal, protective equipment (PPE) - such as safety glasses.
- Wear appropriate attire and shoes - like steel-toe shoes and short sleeves when working with machines that have a powered rotational feature such as a lathe.
- Do not wear jewelry, including rings.
- Do not sport unrestrained long hair.
- Consult operations and service manuals of machines
- Lock-out Tag-out (LOTO).
- Correct use of fire extinguisher; types of fires and regular inspections.
- Ergonomics. Rubber floor mats for support at the workstations.
- Escape routes must be clear of obstacles and emergency exits must not be blocked.
- Other.

Safety precautions in a machine shop are aimed to avoid injuries and tragedies, for example, to eliminate the possibility of a worker being fatally harmed by being entangled in a lathe.

Many machines have safety measurements as built-in parts of their design; for example, an operator must press two buttons which are out of the way for a press or punch to function, and thus not pinch the operator's hands.

== See also ==
- Job shop
- Fab lab
- Forge
- List of metalworking occupations
- Machine factory
- Machine industry
- Machine tool builder
