= Oscar E. Perrigo =

American mechanical engineer, inventor and technical and management author

Charles Oscar Eugene Perrigo (c. 1848 – 1923) was an American mechanical engineer, inventor, and early technical and management author, known for his work on machine shop construction and management, and for his work on lathe design, construction and operation.

== Life and work ==
Perrigo was born in New York and received his education as mechanical engineer. After about three decennia working in industry as Consulting Mechanical Engineer, Perrigo started writing on technical and management subjects early 20th century. Perrigo was a member of the American Society of Mechanical Engineers, and in his works presented himself as an "Expert in machine Shop and Factory Organization, Modern Shop Methods, Time and Cost Systems, etc."

Perigo wrote the successful Modern machine shop: construction, equipment and management in 1906 and Modern American Lathe Practice in 1907. These works were reprinted several times; the last edition of Machine shop work even was published in 1940, revised by the tool engineer Aldrick Bertrand. Perrigo continued writing articles for the Iron Trade Review and some other trade and technical papers, such as the American Machinist. Perigo got associated with the Modern Systems Correspondence School in Boston, Massachusetts.

Early 1910s he was also working as expert patent attorney in Boston, and from 1917 to his death in 1923, he was working for the Pratt & Whitney company in Hartford.

== Work ==
=== Modern machine shop, 1906 ===
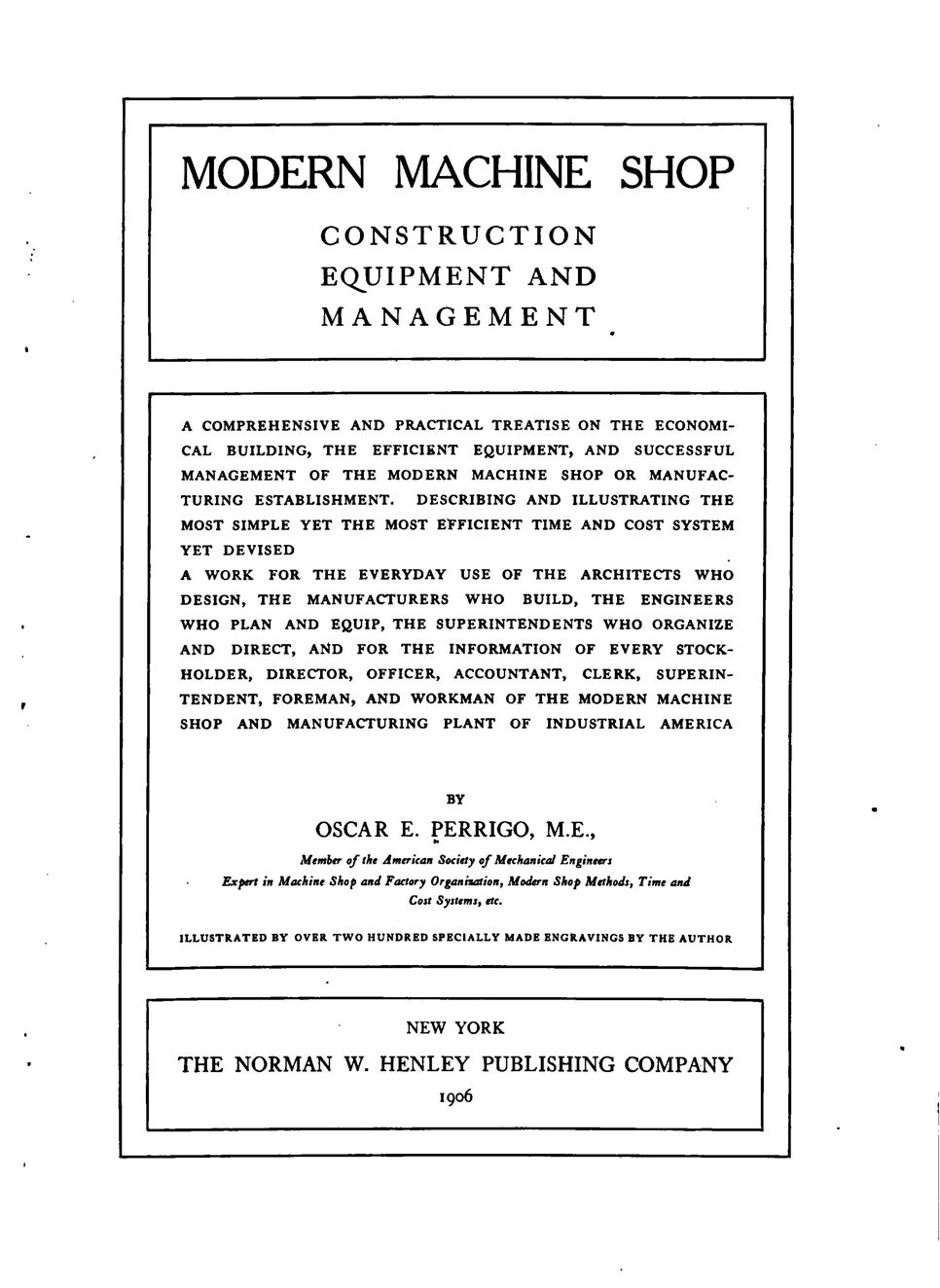
Modern machine shop, 1906.

In the 1906 Modern machine shop: construction, equipment and management Perrigo aimed to "produce a work suitable for the practical and every-day use of the Architects who design, the Manufacturers who build, the Engineers who plan and equip, the Superintendents who organize and direct; and for the information of every Stockholder, Director, Officer, Accountant, Clerk, Superintendent, Foreman, and Workman of the Modem Machine Shop and Manufacturing Plant of Industrial America." The many reprints confirm as Allen (2010) acknowledged, that this book was of sterling value; it was used for class instruction and as handbook for workman."

This work was divided into three parts, as Perrigo explained:

The plan of the work is to divide its subject-matter into three parts or sections :
- Part First being devoted to the Construction of the Modern Machine Shop or Manufacturing Plant, describing and illustrating buildings of approved form and arrangement:
- Part Second to its Equipment with modem Tools, Machines, and Appliances, and the division of the plant into the proper departments for administrative and mechanical purposes; and
- Part Third discussing the all-important question of Management^ showing the fallacy of some of the so-called systems of Management, Time and Cost Systems, and minutely describing and illustrating a plain, concise, accurate, and common-sense System of Management, and of Time and Cost Keeping, that may be easily and economically administered and yet give all the important information necessary for operating the business to financial success.

The work is fully illustrated by over two hundred engravings made from designs and drawings prepared by the author especially for this purpose..."'

One of those engravings was one of the first modern organizational charts (see image below), in which Perrigo pictured the new "System of Organization and Management of the Modern American Shop or Manufacturing Plant." In his days this image was as "the shop tree."

=== Machine shop construction ===
The first part of Modern machine shop, Perrigo (1906) focussed on the physical construction of the building, and presented a model machine shop. Of this idealized situation Perrigo gave descriptions on the front elevation of the factory building model (A), a plan of the works in the machine shop (B), the construction of the factory building (C), and the arrangement of tools and departments (D).

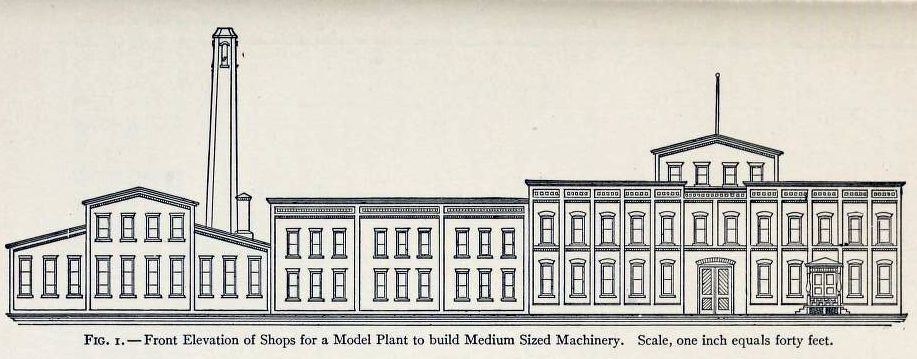
A. Machine Shop Front Elevation

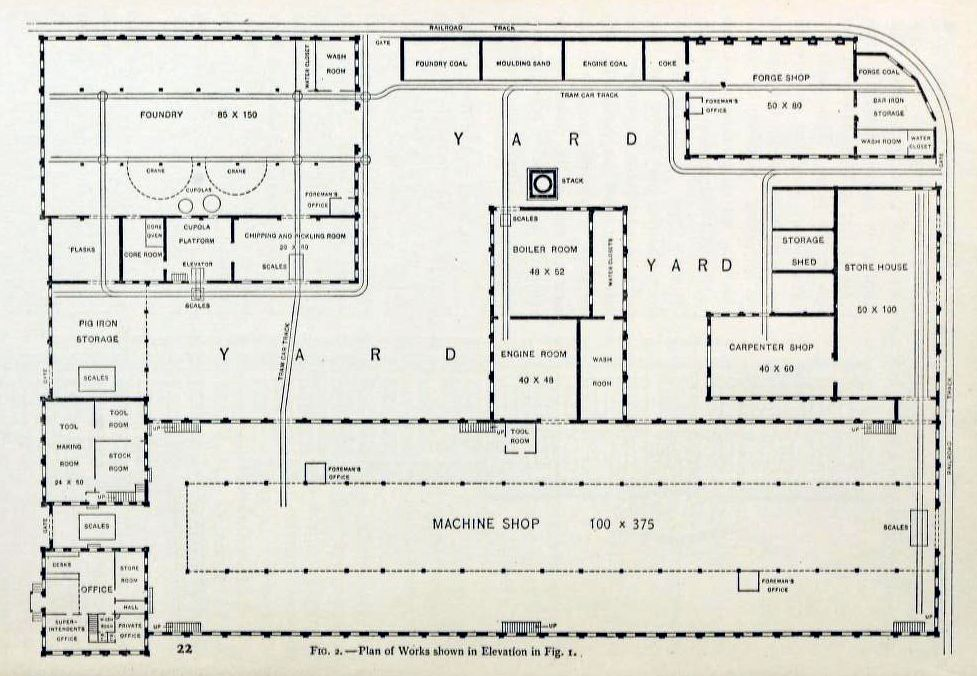
B. Machine Shop, Plan of Works shown in Elevation

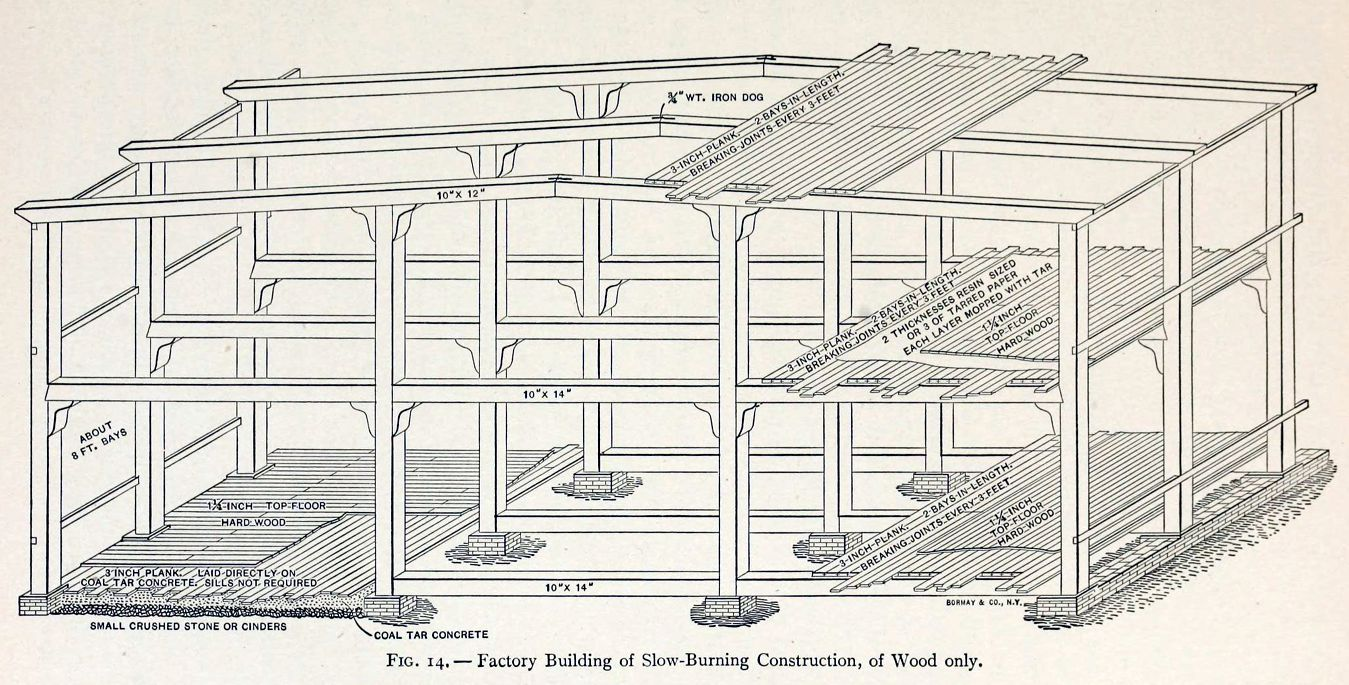
C. Machine Shop Factory Building Construction"

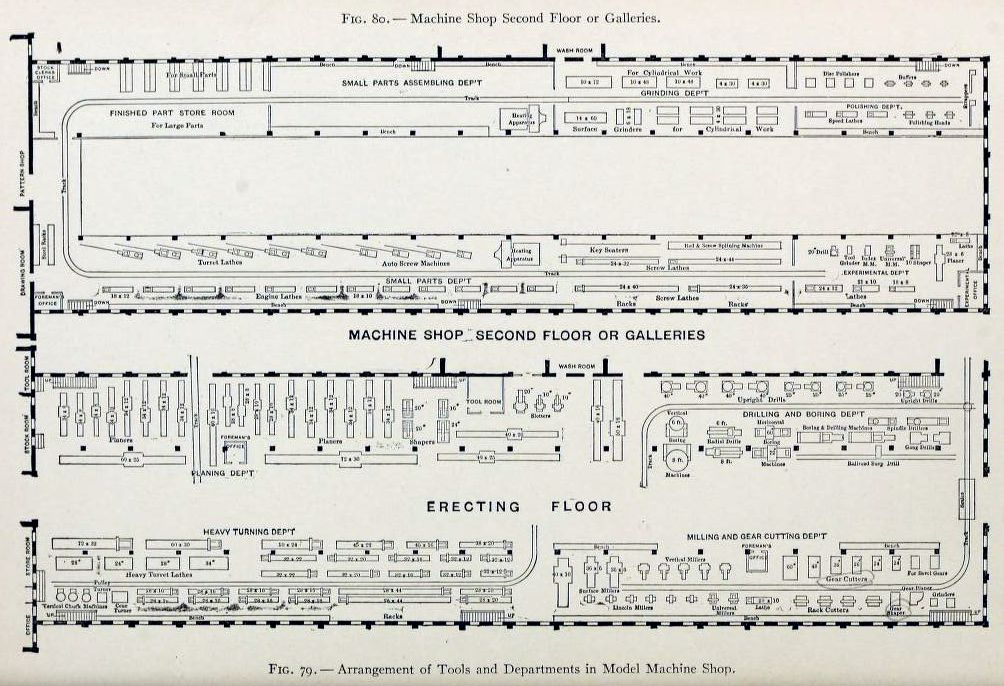
D. Machine Shop Arrangement of Tools and Departments

With this model machine shop Perrigo explored the way the space in factories could be organized. This was not uncommon in his days. Many industrial engineers, like Alexander Hamilton Church, J. Slater Lewis, Hugo Diemer, F.A. Scheffer etc., published plans for some new industrial complex. Details could be quite specific, such as for example the location of the foreman's office. In this matter Perrigo in his 1905 article "Economical Arrangement of Machinery," only stipulated, that it should be prominently located.

In line with this work, in 1911 Charles Day presented a new method, in which the routing diagram was proposed as basis for designing the laying out of industrial plants. This took machine shop construction to another level.

=== Machine shop management ===
In the third part of Modern machine shop, Perrigo (1906) noted, that early 20th century the days of the "one-man management" had died, and instead had come the management by "a system of divided and property distributed responsibility." In this system "the real head of the establishment takes up only the consideration of the larger, broader, and more comprehensive questions of importance in management, leaving to his able assistants the questions of the next grade of importance, and in their special spheres, while they, in turn, divide the next grade of lesser responsibilities with their assistants, the foremen, and so on down through the several grades of less importance to the operatives or workmen." And he continued:

Thus we have what has come to be known as "the shop tree," representing graphically this plan for the division of responsibility in the management of the entire plant. There are three grand factors that go to make up the sum of this problem of manufacturing which should not be lost sight of at the outset.

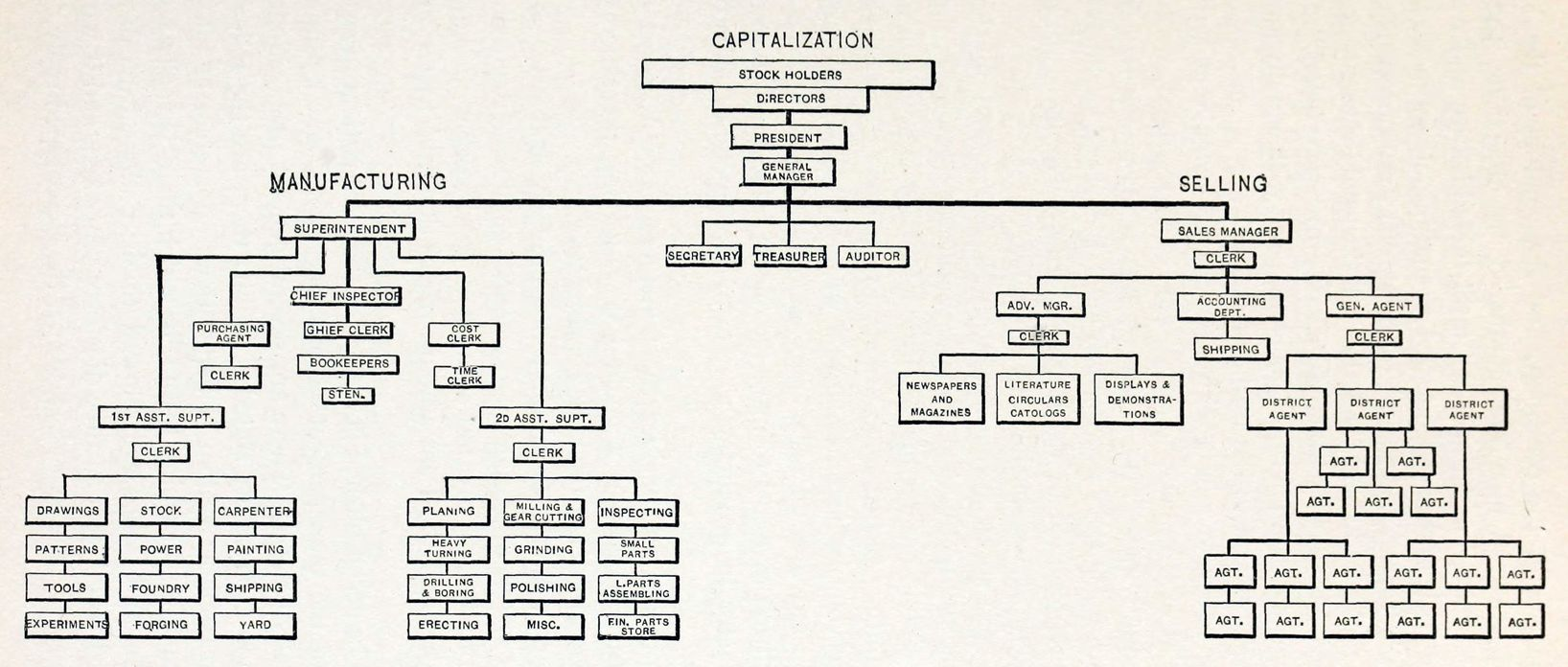
Graphic Chart, showing the System of Organization and Management of the Modern American Shop or Manufacturing Plant, 1906

1. Capitalization of the scheme : The factor comprises the stockholders, represented by the Board of Directors, whose head is the president of the company, and whose executive officer is the general manager. This group includes the administrative and financial departments of the entire establishment.
2. Manufacture of the product : The factor comprises the manufacturing plant, whose head is the works manager or superintendent, and includes the purchase of stock and supplies, the care of the grounds and buildings, and the entire process of manufacturing and shipping the product.
3. Marketing or selling of the product : The factor includes the advertising or publicity department, and the sales department, each with its own manager, and frequently presided over by the vice-president.
While each of these departments are of prime importance in all respects, it is the second that particularly concerns us in this work. Nevertheless it may be interesting and instructive to present, see figure, a graphic diagram representing the division of duties and responsibilities as generally arranged for establishments such as we are considering, and as representing the management of our model manufacturing plant.

Perrigo concludes that "this will show the regular channel for all official orders and communications, as well as, inversely, the channel through which all reports go through intermediate officers to their proper and ultimate destination. It also shows the proper relation of one department with another, of certain groups of departments with other groups, and in a general way the entire plan of organization and management. A careful study of these important relations is recommended to the earnest student of machine shop and factory organization, management, and economics."

=== Modern American Lathe Practice, 1907 ===
In the Modern American Lathe Practice, 1907 Perrigo aimed to present:

- a history and development of the lathe from early times to the present day;
- a briefly discussion of its effects upon manufacturing interests and its practical use on various classes of work; and
- a comparison (representative, theoretical, and practical) of the American lathes as built in the US in his days.

Perrigo explained about the earliest form of a lathe proper, that it was, "a machine for shaping wood into forms having a curved, and generally a circular transverse section, by the action of a chisel or other cutting tool upon the piece, which is rotated for the purpose," as shown in the figure (A).

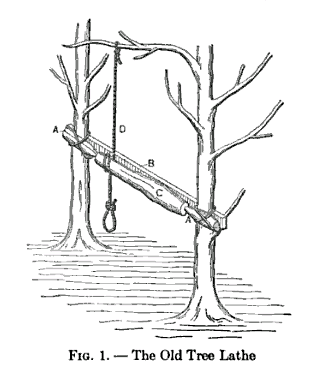
A. The Old Tree Lathe

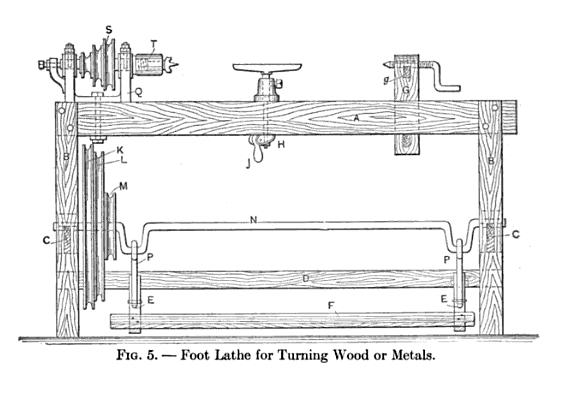
B. Foot Lathe for Turning wood or metal

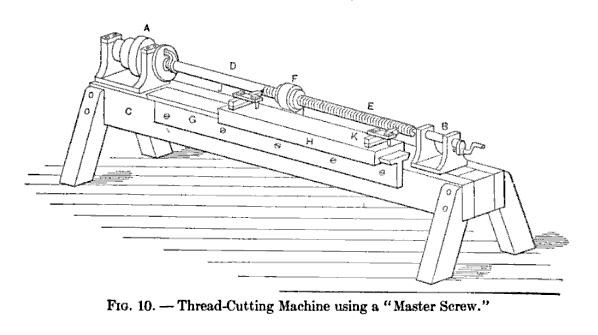
C. Thread-Cutting Machine using a "Master Screw"

Before the Industrial Revolution the foot lathe has been use for many years for turning both wood and metals (see image B). Perrigo mentioned he built such a lathe himself, when he was between fifteen and sixteen years of age. An 18th century new development for lathes was the idea of screw-cutting.

On 18th century innovation in lathe was the use of a "master screw" in the thread-cutting machine, which seems to have been of French origin. Perrigo explained that "in this lathe there was an arbor upon which threads of different pitches had been cut. These threads were on short sections of the arbor and by its use the different pitches required could be cut. While the exact manner of using this arbor was not described, its probable method of use will readily suggest itself to the mechanic, and was, no doubt, used at an earlier period, and in fact was what led up to the use of a lead screw or arbor with a multiplicity of different pitches. The principle is analogous to that used in the "Fox" brass finishing lathe so well known and extensively used, not only in finishing plain surfaces but in " chasing threads. This machine is shown" in the third image.

Later in the book Perrigo focussed on contemporary problems of for example the introduction of high-speed steel. One of the many anecdotes mentioned, was about the problem of the fast-moving ribbon of metal, that with high-speed steel got thrown of the lathe. Perrigo recalled: "At a speed of, say, two hundred feet per minute, the chip comes writhing and twisting, almost red hot, in a continuous length, shooting here and there, everywhere but the chip box; and quick must be the workman that manages to keep well out of the way of it, for it 'sticketh like a brother' when once he gets tangled in it..."

== Publications ==
- Oscar E. Perrigo. Change gear devices, describing and illustrating the development of the screw-cutting lathe and the United States patents upon the methods for obtaining various pitches of screw threads. Prefaced by a brief history of the engine lathe. 2d ed. New York, The N.W. Henley Publishing Co., 1903/09.
- Oscar E. Perrigo. Modern machine shop: construction, equipment and management New York, The N.W. Henley publishing company, 1906.
- Oscar E. Perrigo. Modern American Lathe Practice. A New, Complete and Practical Work on the "king of Machine Shop Tools.", 1907.
- Oscar E. Perrigo. Worm gearing. New York city, The Industrial press, 1908.
- Oscar E. Perrigo. Shop systems lessons: Modern systems of mechanical engineering. Modern Systems Correspondence School, Boston. Modern Systems Press, 1910.
- Oscar E. Perrigo. Mechanical Drawing.The Industrial Press, 1912
- Oscar E. Perrigo, Frederick W. Turner, and Howard P. Fairfield.. Machine shop work; a comprehensive manual of approved shop methods, including the construction and use of tools and machines, the details of their efficient operation, and a discussion of modern production methods, 1918.
- Oscar E. Perrigo. Small Tools and Gages. Pratt & Whitney Company, 1923.

Articles and papers, a selection:

- Oscar E. Perrigo. "Economical Arrangement of Machinery," System 8 (Sept. 1905): 261–65
- Perrigo, Oscar E., and Hugo Diemer. "Raising the Efficiency of Men and Machinery." System, April, June, September, 1906, vol. 9, pp. 426, 605
- Oscar E. Perrigo. "A Practical System of Lettering," 1909.

== Patents ==
- Patent US229434, for process and Machine for Drying Tabacco, 1880.
- Patent US494383, for engine lathe, 1893.
- Patent US499929 for engine lathe, 1893.
