= Charles Day (engineer) =

American engineer (1879–1931)

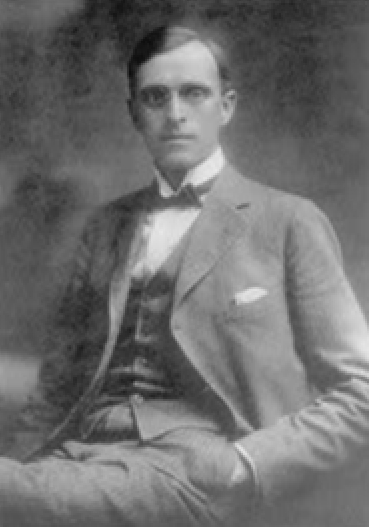
Charles Day (1879–1931)

Charles Day (May 15, 1879 – May 10, 1931) was an American electrical, construction and consulting engineer, and co-founder of Day & Zimmermann. He is known as a specialist in public utility management and operation, and for his seminal contributions to flow charts and the routing diagram.

== Biography ==
=== Youth, education and early career ===
Day was born in 1879 in Germantown, Philadelphia, son of Charles A. Day and Frances Corson Day. He attended Germantown Academy, where he met his future business partner Kern Dodge, son of James Mapes Dodge. After graduation he entered the University of Pennsylvania, where he received his BS in 1899 in Electrical Engineering. Thereafter in 1901 he obtained his Master of Engineering in 1901.

After obtaining his master's degree, Day was superintendent of installation of power-plant equipment and transmission machinery at the 1899 Philadelphia Export Exposition, where James Mapes Dodge had served on the exhibition commission. At its close, 31 November 1899, Day entered the employ of Link Belt Engineering Co. in Nicetown–Tioga where James Mapes Dodge was president. He started out as assistant to superintendent and became engineer of works, working on modernizing the plant.

Dodge himself would become one of the promoters of scientific management, and Day would follow into those footsteps. One decade later a 1911 article in The American Magazine would present Day as one of a dozen frontmen of scientific management.

=== Career as construction and consulting engineer ===
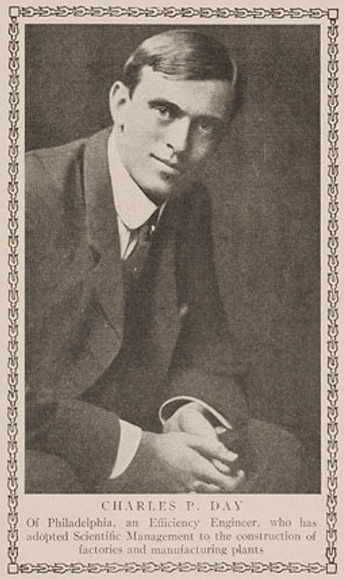
The American Magazine, May 1911

After Day's friend Kern Dodge obtained his BS in mechanical engineering at Drexel Institute in 1901, the two of them founded the company Dodge & Day, specializing in engineering, shop equipment and management. One of their first employees was Conrad N. Lauer. Later, the scope of the organization was enlarged to include a great deal of engineering and construction work in both the industrial and public-service fields. In 1907, another former classmate John Zimmerman joined the firm as partner, and they renamed the firm Dodge, Day & Zimmermann. After Kern Dodge withdrew as partner in 1911, the firm became Day & Zimmermann, incorporated in 1916, and still exists today.

One of the associates in the consulting firm of Charles Day was Walter Polakov from 1912 to 1915, who had joined Gantt's consulting firm in 1915, and started his own firm in 1915. In World War I Day served on the United States Shipping Board in its Emergency Fleet Corporation. He wrote a series of lectures for the Harvard Business School, and was a trustee of the University of Pennsylvania.

Day was an active member of the American Society of Mechanical Engineers; member of the Board of Managers and chairman of the mechanical engineering section of the Franklin Institute, associate member of the American Institute of Electrical Engineers, now IEEE; member of the former New York Electrical Society; member of the Engineers Club of Philadelphia, and Engineers' Club; member of the Machinery Club, New York; and member of the American Philosophical Society.

=== Death ===
Still chairman of the board of Day & Zimmermann, Inc., Charles Day died May 10, 1931, in the University Hospital, Philadelphia after an illness of ten days at the age of fifty-three.

== Work ==
Educated at first in Electrical Engineering, Day's work developed into the fields of mechanical, construction, civil and management engineering. It is not without reason his biographer Taylor, H. Birchard (1953) named him a "Symbol of American Industrial Genius."

In the mentioned 1911 article in The American Magazine by Frederick Winslow Taylor, Day was presented as "Charles P. Day of Philadelphia, an efficiency engineer, who adopted Scientific Management to the construction of factories and manufacturing plants." For the design of manufacturing plants and civil works, Day co-founded his own engineering firm that still exists today. Day did more than just adopt ideas, and brought them into practice. He developed one or two innovative graphical techniques, and with that contributed to the graphic history of scientific management.

=== Day & Zimmermann ===
In 1901 Day and Kern Dodge laid the foundation for the engineering company Day & Zimmermann. According to American Society of Civil Engineers (1975) the two founders both had in common, that they "dreamed of a new and revolutionary business: Modernizing Engineering... [However] in those early days their assets were a modest shed building, high hopes and a good idea. They had no clients." The story how it all started, has been told:

"... Their ad in American Machinist drew one response — from the owner of a firm In New York who said he was curious to see a "Modernizing Engineer" and wanted the young men to "drop in sometime". Day and Dodge did drop in and the next morning they added their first client to their list of assets. In the early 1900s time studies, efficiency experts and program planning were virtually unknown. Management and administration had not kept up with dramatic engineering developments. Dodge and Day introduced a new concept which they called Betterment Reports — assessment and evaluation studies to help industries' management become more efficient, aggressive and progressive..."

One of the first notable engineering accomplishments of the Day & Zimmermann company was the design of the construction of the Gatun Lock System, one of the Panama Canal locks in 1907. The construction of the Gatun Lock began with the first concrete laid at Gatun, on August 24, 1909, by the Philadelphia-based company Day, Dodge & Zimmermann.

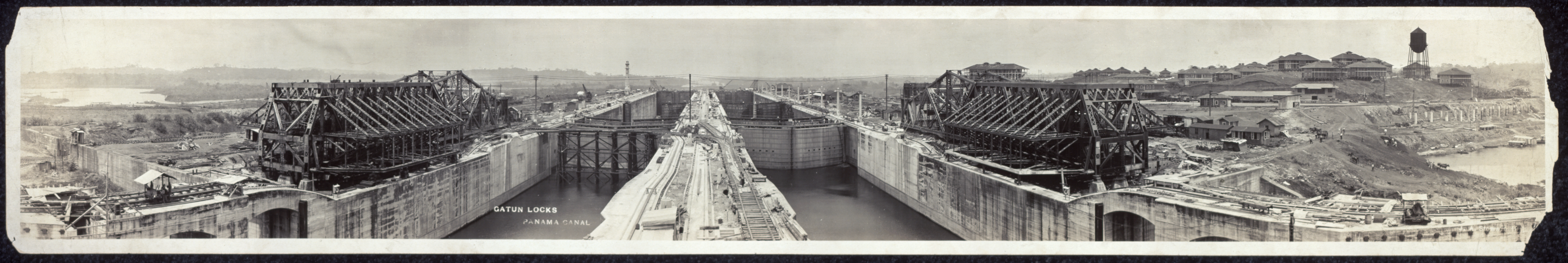
Gatun Locks under construction, circa 1913

In 1914, the company was contacted by the Hershey chocolate company to produce the foil wrapping machines for Hershey's Kisses.

=== "The Machine Shop Problem," 1903 ===
In the 1903 paper entitled "The Machine Shop Problem" in the Transactions of the American Society of Mechanical Engineers, Day presented a method for the analysis and organization design of machine shops based on the Taylor System. The first subject of discussion was the subdivision of the departments of a machine shop. For this matter a general subdivision and a further subdivision can be made. The following topics of discussion were the means of attaining economical production in the machine shop, the Question of Power Application with Courses to fulfill the conditions, and the advantages derived from the use of individual motors on machine tools. The last topic was the graphical distribution of costs, showing cost value of operations.

=== Routing diagram ===
The 1909 article in the Engineering Magazine entitled The routing diagram as a basis for laying out industrial plants proposed a new type of graphic illustration of the material flow through industrial plants, named the routing diagram. The first presentation itself had the following intention:

"The primary purpose of this article is to call attention to the advantages that can be derived from the use of the graphical routing diagram as a basis for the planning of industrial plants. This diagram, as its name implies, indicates the paths or routes followed by the materials of manufacture when passing from their crude to their finished state, and in its final development it absolutely defines the plant in all particulars of layout."

The graphic method presented consisted of two types of routing diagram, a perspective routing diagram and a detail routing diagram, combined with an exterior view. The article itself gives as an example the design of a gasoline automobile factory. The given graphics deliver complementary views with:

- Perspective routing diagram, in outline, showing paths followed during manufacture of principal units entering into gasoline automobiles
- Exterior view of automobile plant to which the routing diagram relates
- Detail Routing Diagram, Machine-tool equipment and paths or parts in a wagon- and carriage-axle plant

These views were illustrated with the following three images:

Set of routing diagrams by Charles Day, 1909
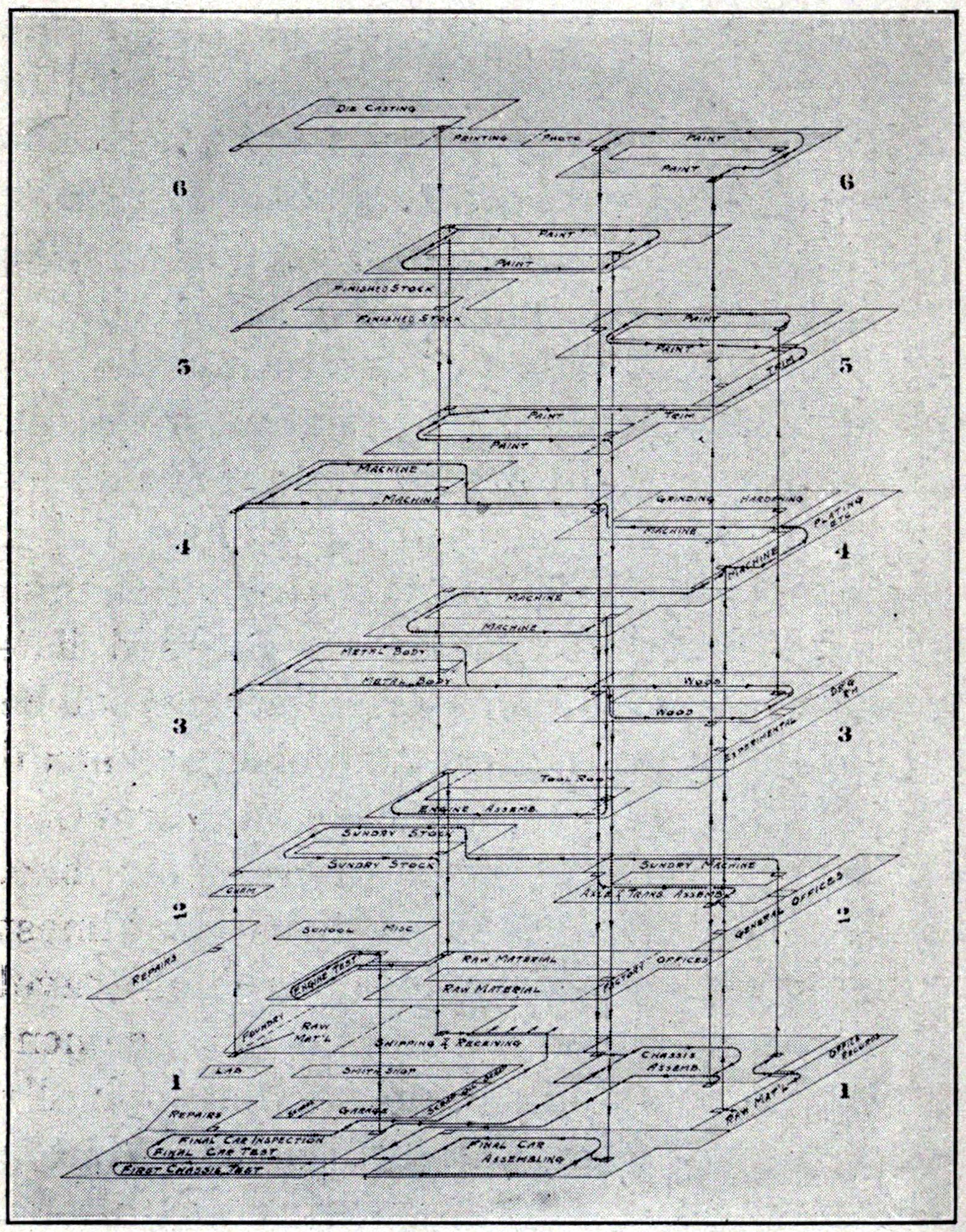
Perspective routing diagram, in outline

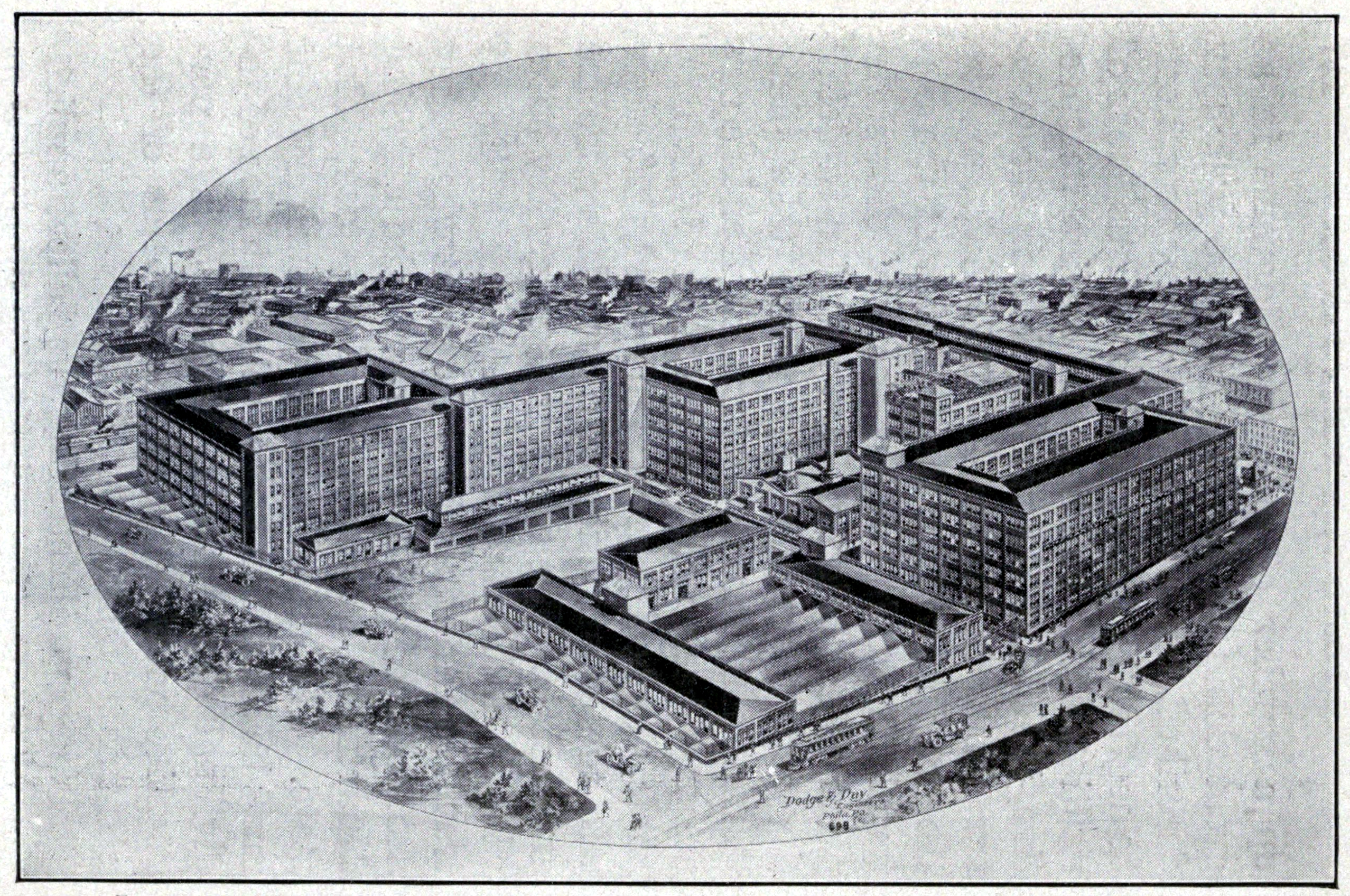
Exterior view of automobile plant

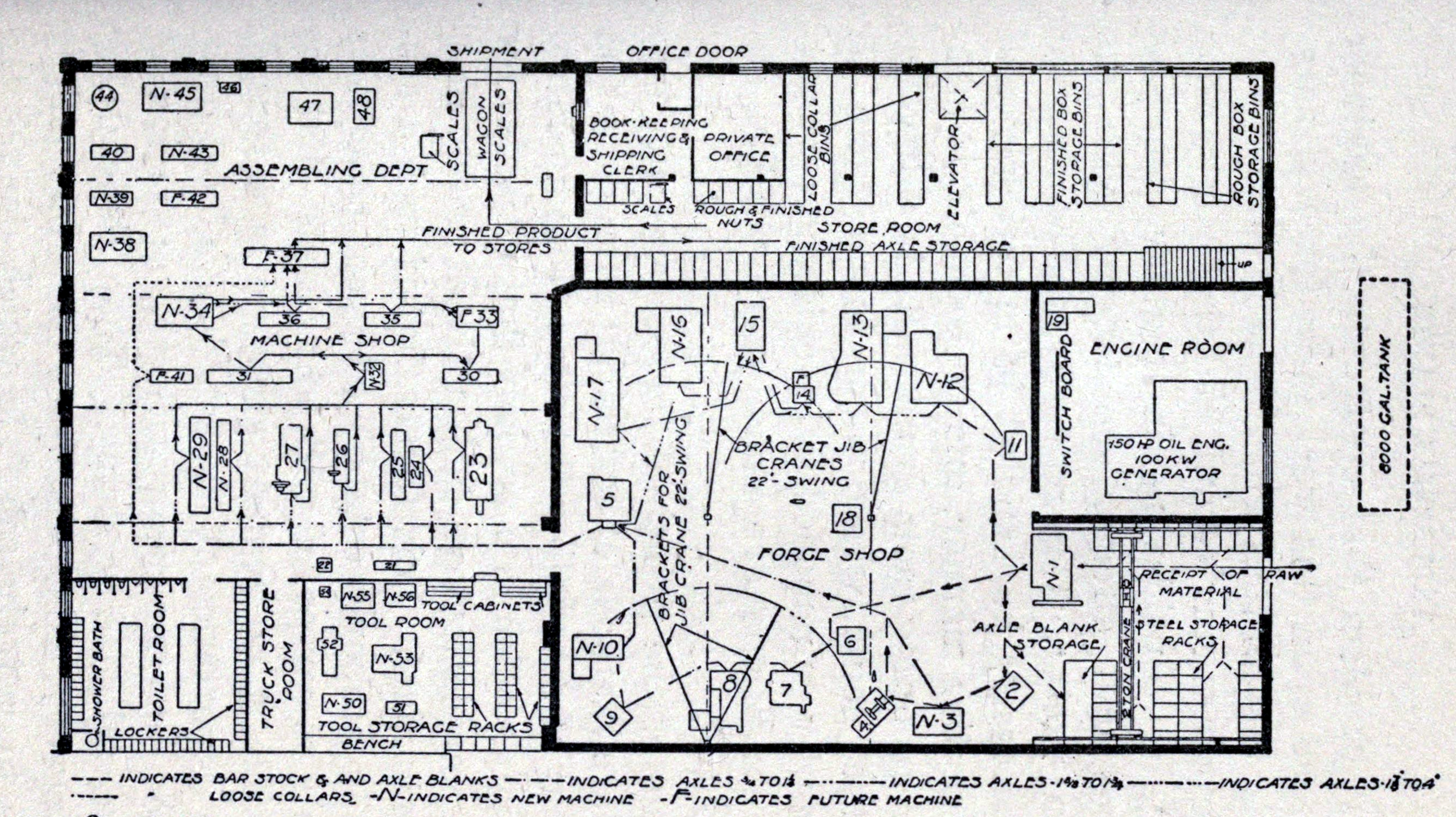
Detail Routing Diagram

Despite this clear presentation, neither Charles Day nor anybody else is generally credited for making a seminal contribution to the routing diagram or route diagram. For example, in one of the first seminal works in the field, the 1923 book Industrial Management by Richard H. Lansburgh, there is a separate chapter "Factory Building and Plant Lay out." This chapter discussed the matter with the similar three types of views, and some more, without any reference to the work of Charles Day. Instead of perspective routing diagram, Lansburgh speaks of vertical layout, and the detail routing diagram is named a flow chart.

With the articles of Wrege (1978), Wrege (1999) and others, there is a re-evaluation of these contributions. For example, the AA Files (2005, p. 50) summarized that:

... this new route diagram was introduced by efficiency engineer Charles Day (1879–1931) in 1911 as the basis for the layout and design of industrial plants. Assuming that interior function should entirely determine a factory's layout. Day claimed that after the flow diagram was complete the building 'merely needed to be drawn around it'. This diagrammatic method assured that 'the imagination will not be drawn upon because the assumptions are based on absolute facts and not theory' – a positivist, objective stance that came to dominate ideas about flow diagrams.

Day was not the first to introduce the concept of routing diagrams. For example, James Bray Griffith in his 1905 book Systematizing already contained a section on "Charting factory layout and routing" which contained two simplified routing diagrams for handling lumber, that he called arrangements. Another contemporary, Oscar E. Perrigo, published on the design of machine shops in his Modern machine shop (1906), looking at machine shop lay out and arrangements of machinery. In contrast to this work, Day did take this design problem to a next level by putting the dynamic interaction first.

=== Management of Navy yards ===
In 1911 Charles Day worked together with Henry Gantt and Harrington Emerson to study the management of Navy yards, which didn't work out right. Wren (2009) summarized that "their efforts went for naught when, following the Interstate Commerce Commission hearings in late 1911, the Secretary of the Navy announced that he would never allow scientific management to be applied in the nation’s shipyards."

The breakthrough happened in the same period, as Wren (2009) further explained:

"Just prior to the war, Gantt had also served as a consultant to General William Crozier, head of the U.S. Army Ordnance Department. Crozier, impressed by Gantt’s graphic displays, developed a series of progress and performance charts to aid in managing army arsenals. When Gantt gave up his consulting work to aid in the war effort, he puzzled over how to track the huge amount of defense work being performed at so many different sites. Scheduling was especially crucial, and the information necessary to plan and coordinate private contractors’ efforts with those of government agencies was lacking. Gantt spent three months trying to solve this puzzle before realizing that We have all been wrong in scheduling on a basis of quantities; the essential element in the situation is time, and this should be the basis in laying out any program...."

The developments set in motion in those days did pave the way to the realization of Gantt charts.

== Reception ==
=== Early charts of information flow ===
In June 1903 Charles Day had presented a paper entitled The Machine Shop Problem as described above, in which he proposed a number of charts to be used in management. This paper was first presented at the Saratoga meeting of the American Society of Mechanical Engineers (ASME). Day, by then still a junior ASME member, had presented his paper to an audience with among others Frederick Winslow Taylor, Henry Gantt and John Calder commenting on his ideas. It was John Calder (1903) who commented:

"Referring to Mr. Day's graphical method of illustrating certain routine in respect to manufacturing in the shop, I will say I think that is one of the most useful methods which a manager can have before him. It can be carried out in many different ways, so that not only the manager can from time to time refresh his memory as to the duties of the men by graphically illustrating to them, but he can also have the reference there before his eyes in the event of new men coming in, and by means of that graphic representation, can show them how to pick up their work much more quickly and put it through. It also enables one to pick out bad methods and prevent work retrograding. I would say, in conclusion, that the method Mr. Day has brought forward can be used generally, broadly, and also in detail, with great success. I hand in samples of charts which I have drawn up and use daily in the practical work of production..."

For management historian Charles D. Wrege the work by Day and Calder were some of the earliest presenting charts of information flow. Wrege et al. (1999) summarized:

"... Charles Day and John Calder revealed a series of charts designed to outline information flow and to demonstrate the advantage of network analysis of alternative methods of modernizing factories..."

There is no question one of the charts presented by Day is a network; charts that outline information flows were only presented by Calder. Day presented two organizational charts, and four more or less classification charts or concept maps. Furthermore, Wrege et al. (1999) mentioned how the story continued:

"... Day’s Company, Dodge and Day (later Day and Zimmerman), utilized his network charts, betterment reports and early form of decision trees until his death in 1933, building a consulting company worth millions. After Day’s death, Day and Zimmerman reportedly sold Day’s original charts to the Lockheed Company..."

For Wrege this was an example of "What we do not know about management history," because "their eventual fate and how they became incorporated into management information systems literature is still a mystery...."

=== Personal remembrance ===
In a 1931 appreciation, the Electrical World T & D had the following summary of his reputation and accomplishments:

"Mr. Day was especially known as a specialist in public utility management and operation, although he first established a national reputation as an economist and exponent of manufacturing efficiency in industrial plants. After many years of successful work in the manufacturing field he extended his interest to the public utility field, and it was not long before his contacts became far reaching, embracing both the technical and the financial phases of the business."

On a more personal level, H. Birchard Taylor (1952) in the first Charles Day lecture remembered:

"If you were to ask me to name Charles Day's personal attributes, I would reply: utter integrity; kindness; inexhaustible energy; and a rare gift of inspiring his associates with enthusiasm towards a constructive objective. His was true leadership..."

Taylor further expressed Day's experience in scientific management since the early 1900s, and particularly his dealings with the Navy during World War I. In remembrance of his name, the Newcomen Society in North America held an annual Charles Day lecture for decades.

== Selected publications ==
- Charles Day. Machine-tool operation for maximum production, New York, etc. 1909. Reprinted from the Engineering Magazine.
- Charles Day. Industrial plants; their arrangement and construction. New York, Engineering Magazine, 1911.

Articles, a selection

- Charles Day, "The Machine Shop Problem," Trans. ASME, Vol. 24 (1903), pp. 1302–1321. (at archive.org)
- Charles Day, "Advanced Practice in Economical Metal Cutting," Engineering Magazine, Vol. 27, 1904. pp. 549–566
- Charles Day, "Discussion on the Individual Operation of Machine Tools by Electric Motors," Journal of the Franklin Institute 158 (November 1904): pp. 321–352.
- Charles Day, "Electric Motors in Machine Shop Service." Transactions of the International Electrical Congress, St. Louis, 1904. J.B. Lyon Company, 1905. pp. 590–99
- Charles Day, "Metal-Working Plants, Their Machine-Tool Equipment," Engineering Magazine 39 (June–July 1910): pp. 364–76.
- Charles Day, "Metal-Working Plants, Their Machine-Tool Equipment; II: Buildings for heavy and general machine works" Engineering Magazine 39 (June–July 1910): pp. 535–48.
- Charles Day, "The Routing Diagram as a Basis for laying Out Industrial Plants." Engineering Magazine, September, 1910. pp. 809–821; Republished in: Industrial Plants, 1911. Chapter VII.
- Charles Day, "Management Principles and the Consulting Engineer," Engineering Magazine, April 1911: 133–40; reprinted in: Thompson, Clarence Bertrand, Scientific management; a collection of the more significant articles describing the Taylor system of management. 1914, pp. 205–216.
- Charles Day, "Constructive Policy for Public Service Corporations," Proceedings of the Conference of American Mayors on Public Policies as to Municipal Utilities, Volume 57. Conference of American Mayors. American Academy of Political and Social Science, 1915. pp. 83–91
