= Conrad N. Lauer =

American engineer (1869–1943)

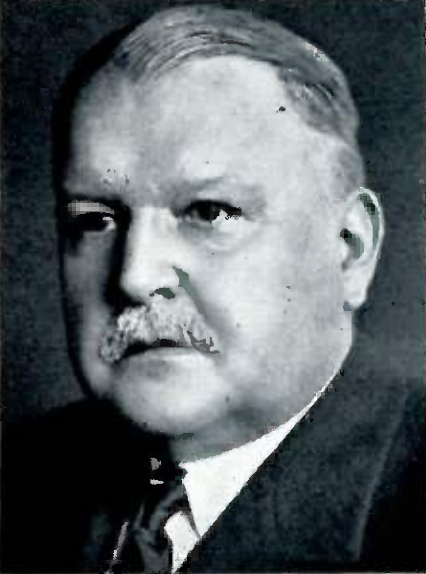
Conrad N. Lauer, President A.G.A.

Conrad Newton Lauer (1869 – 1943) was an American mechanical engineer, general manager at Day & Zimmerman, Inc., chairman of the Philadelphia Gas Works Co., and 51st president of the American Society of Mechanical Engineers in 1932–33.

== Biography ==
=== Youth, education and early career ===
Lauer was born on November 25, 1869, in Three Tuns, Pennsylvania, in Montgomery County to Herman Lauer and Margaret Lukens (Clayton) Lauer. His grandfather John G. Lauer had settled there around 1850, having emigrated from Stuttgart, Germany.

In his native county Lauer attended public and private schools, and subsequently received his technical training under private tutors. In 1893 he started his career in the industry as clerk at the Link-Belt Company in Philadelphia, now the FMC Corporation, and worked his way up to superintendent until 1902. In those days he assisted several consulting engineers with the introduction of scientific management methods.

=== Later career ===
In 1902 Lauer joined as industrial engineer the new engineering company Dodge & Day, founded by Charles Day and Ken Dodge, son of James Mapes Dodge. In 1916 the company proceeded as Day & Zimmerman, Inc., where Lauer was appointed secretary and general manager. In the 1920s Lauer was appointed chairman of the Philadelphia Gas Works, and he later served as chairman of the board of the Philadelphia Gas Works Co.

In the 1930s Lauer was also Vice-President and Director of the United Gas Improvement Company, and a Director of the Welsbach Company, of Baldwin Locomotive Works, and of Sharp and Dohme, Inc.

In 1929 Lauer was the donor of the Hoover Medal, named after and first awarded to Herbert Hoover. In 1930 Lauer was awarded an honorary M.E. degree from the Stevens Institute of Technology. In 1932-33 he served as president of the American Society of Mechanical Engineers.

Lauer died on August 2, 1943.

== Selected publications ==
- Conrad Newton Lauer. Engineering in American industry; the development of industry in these United States during one hundred and twenty years. Volume I and II. McGraw-Hill book company, inc., 1924.
- Conrad Newton Lauer. John Ericsson, engineer, 1803-1889, Newcomen Society American Branch, 1939.
- Conrad Newton Lauer. William Penn's Philadelphia--in 1840, Newcomen Society American Branch, 1940.

Selected articles

- Conrad N. Lauer. "The Importance of Cost-Keeping To the Manufacturer," The Annals of the American Academy of Political and Social Science, 22.3 (1903): 47–57.
- Lauer, Conrad Newton. "Plant Engineering as a Service to Production Management." The Annals of the American Academy of Political and Social Science. 119.1 (1925): 97-102.
