= Joshua Rose (engineer) =

American engineer, inventor and journalist

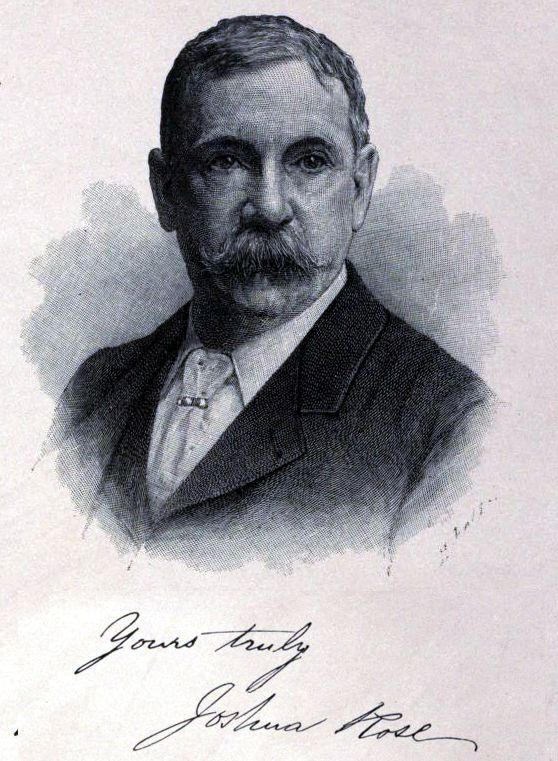
Joshua Rose, 1901

Joshua John Rose (1838 – 14 November 1898) was an English-American mechanical engineer, inventor, engineering journalist and early American writer on management. Rose is known for his contributions to the professional literature of mechanical engineering, specifically on tools and machine shop methods and practice.

== Life and work ==
Rose was born in London in 1838, the son of engineer James Rose and his wife, Annette. He married Tryphena Sarah Hepburn on Christmas Day 1861 at Ashford, Kent. He became a naturalized citizen in 1872 while working in New York City as a machinist.

Rose filled his first patent for a rock drill on 1869. In the 1870s he started writing on mechanical engineering, publishing one of his first articles in Scientific American in 1875, entitled "Practical Mechanism."

In the late 1880s Rose moved to England, where he settled in Twickenham, 10 miles southwest of the centre of London. There he developed a useful improvement for steam-engine valves, which he patented in 1890. By the late 1890s Rose was back in New York, where in 1898 he wrote the preface of the third edition of his Modern machine-shop practice.

In A History of the American Society of Mechanical Engineers from 1880 to 1915 (1915), Frederick Remsen Hutton recognized Joshua Rose, Egbert P. Watson and Coleman Sellers as notable contributors to the professional literature of mechanical engineering with respect to tools and machine shop methods.

He died in Manhattan in 1898, aged 61.

== Work ==
=== Mechanical Drawing Self-Taught, 1883 ===
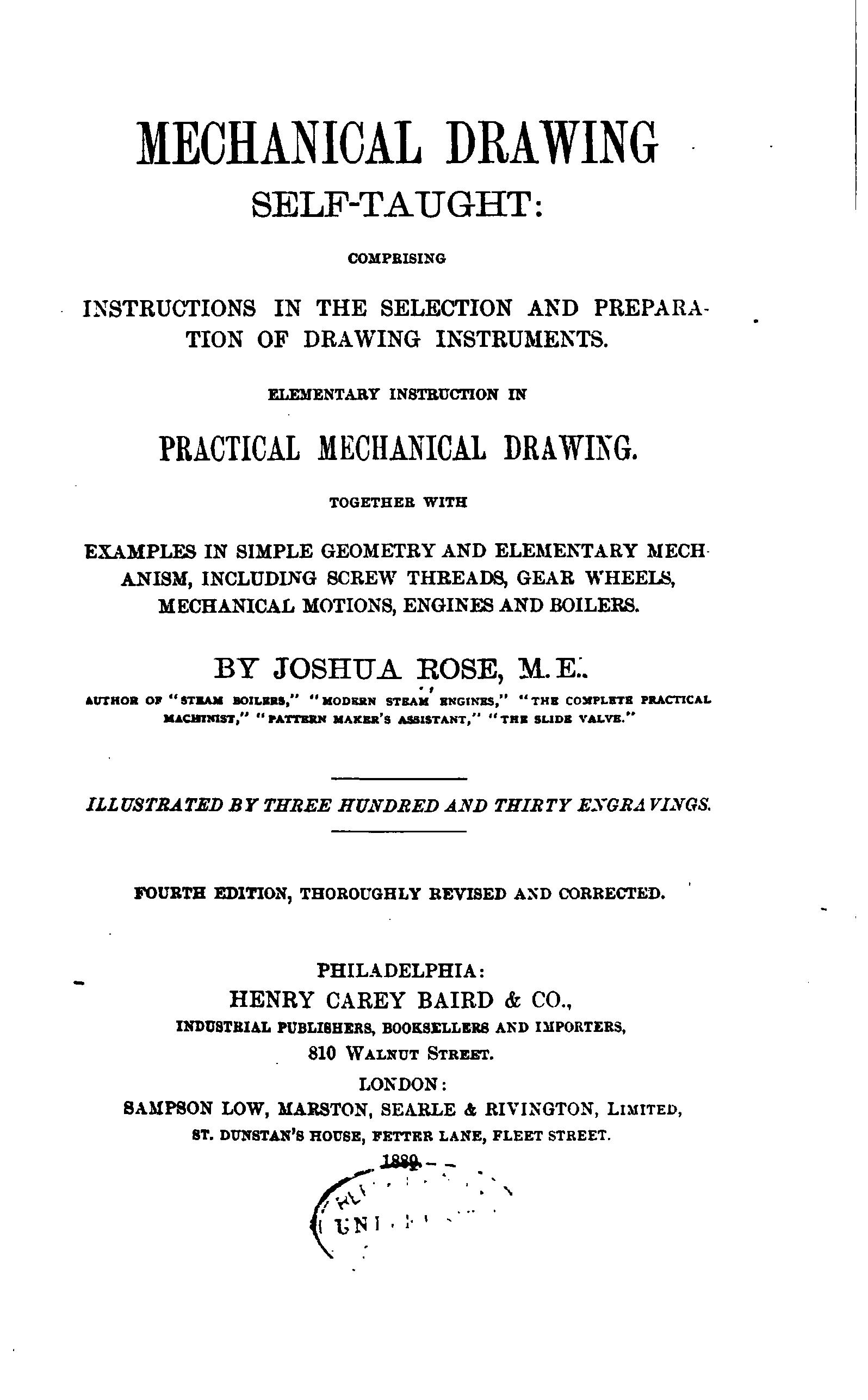
Mechanical Drawing Self-taught, title page, 1899

In the 1883 preface of "Mechanical Drawing Self-Taught", Rose explained that, the object of the book is to enable the beginner to learn to make simple mechanical drawings without the aid of an instructor, and to create an interest in the subject by giving examples such as the machinist meets with in his every-day workshop practice.

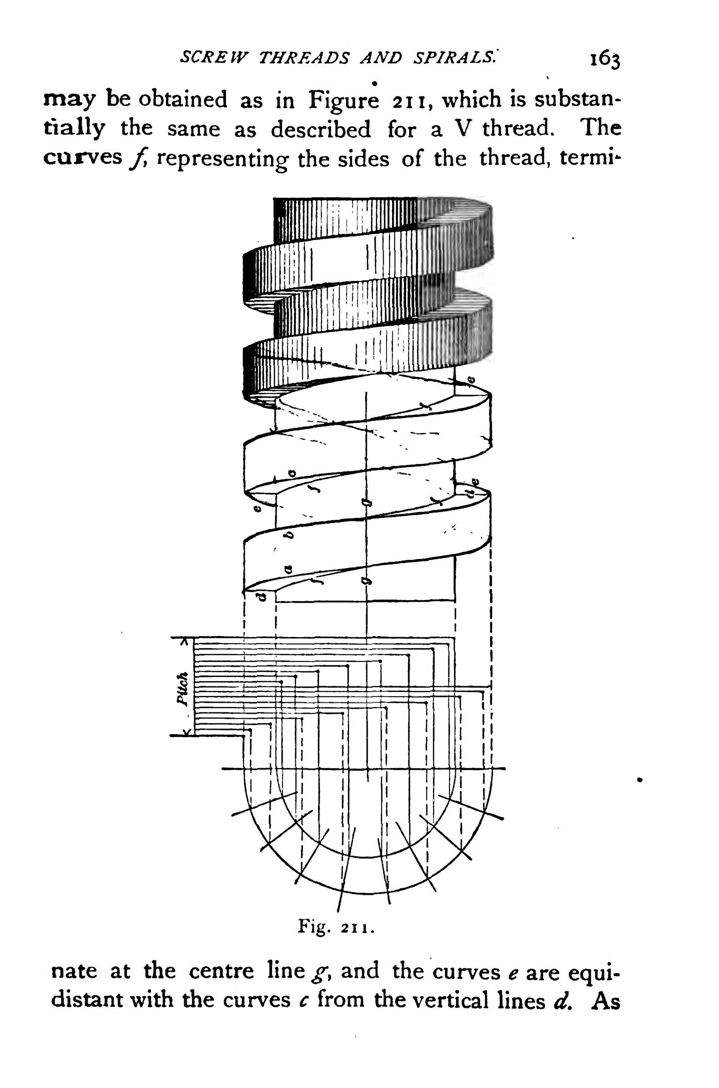
Mechanical Drawing Self-Taught, p. 163

The plan of representing in many examples the pencil lines, and numbering the order in which they are marked, Rose believed to possess great advantages for the learner, since it is the producing of the pencil lines that really proves the study, the inking in being merely a curtailed repetition of the pencilling. Similarly when the drawing of a piece, such, for example, as a fully developed screw thread, is shown fully developed from end to end, even though the pencil lines were all shown, yet the process of construction will be less clear than if the process of development be shown gradually along the drawing.

It is the numerous inquiries from working machinists for a book of this kind that have led Rose to its production, which he hopes and believes will meet the want thus indicated, giving to the learner a sufficiently practical knowledge of mechanical drawing to enable him to proceed further by copying such drawings as he may be able to obtain, or by the aid of some of the more expensive and elaborate books already published on the subject.

Rose believed that in learning mechanical drawing without the aid of an instructor the chief difficulty is overcome when the learner has become sufficiently familiar with the instruments to be enabled to use them without hesitation or difficulty, and it is to attain this end that the chapter on plotting mechanical motions and the succeeding examples have been introduced; these forming studies that are easily followed by the beginner; while sufficiently interesting to afford to the student pleasure as well as profit.

=== Different views of a mechanical drawing ===
In Chapter VI of "Mechanical Drawing Self-Taught", Rose gave his theory on the requirement for arranging different views of a mechanical drawing. As a start he gave a definition of the terms elevation, plan and general view:

- The word elevation, as applied to mechanical drawing, means simply a view; hence a side elevation is a side view, or an end elevation is an end view.
- The word plan is employed in place of the word top; hence a plan view is a top view, or a view looking down upon the top of the piece.
- A general view means a view showing the machine put together or assembled, while a detail drawing is one containing a detail, as a part of the machine or a single piece disconnected from the other parts of the whole machine.

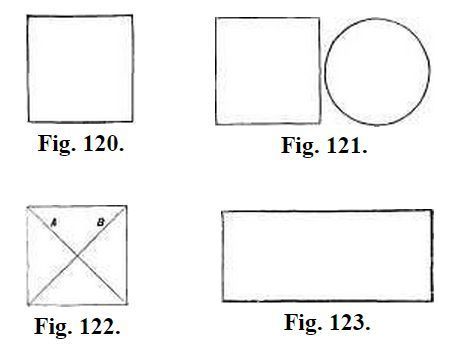
Mechanical Drawing Self-Taught, 1883 p. 96

Rose further explained, that it is obviously desirable in a mechanical drawing to present the piece of work in as few views as possible, but in all cases there must be a sufficient number to permit of the dimensions in every necessary direction to be marked on the drawing. Suppose, then, that in Figure 120 we have to represent a solid cylinder, whose length equals its diameter, and it is obvious that both the diameter and length may be marked in the one view given; hence, a second view, such as shown by the circle in Figure 121, is unnecessary, except it be to distinguish the body from a cube, in which the [95] one view would also be sufficient whereon to mark all the dimensions necessary to enable the piece to be made. It happens, however, that a cube and a cylinder are the only two figures upon which all the dimensions can be marked on one view of the piece, and as cylindrical pieces are much more common in machine work than cubes are, it is taken for granted that, where the pieces are cylindrical, but one view shall be used, and that where they are cubes either two views shall be given, or where they are square a cross shall be marked upon the parts that are square; thus, in Figure 122, is shown a cross formed by the lines A B across the face of the drawing, which saves making a second view.

=== Projections ===
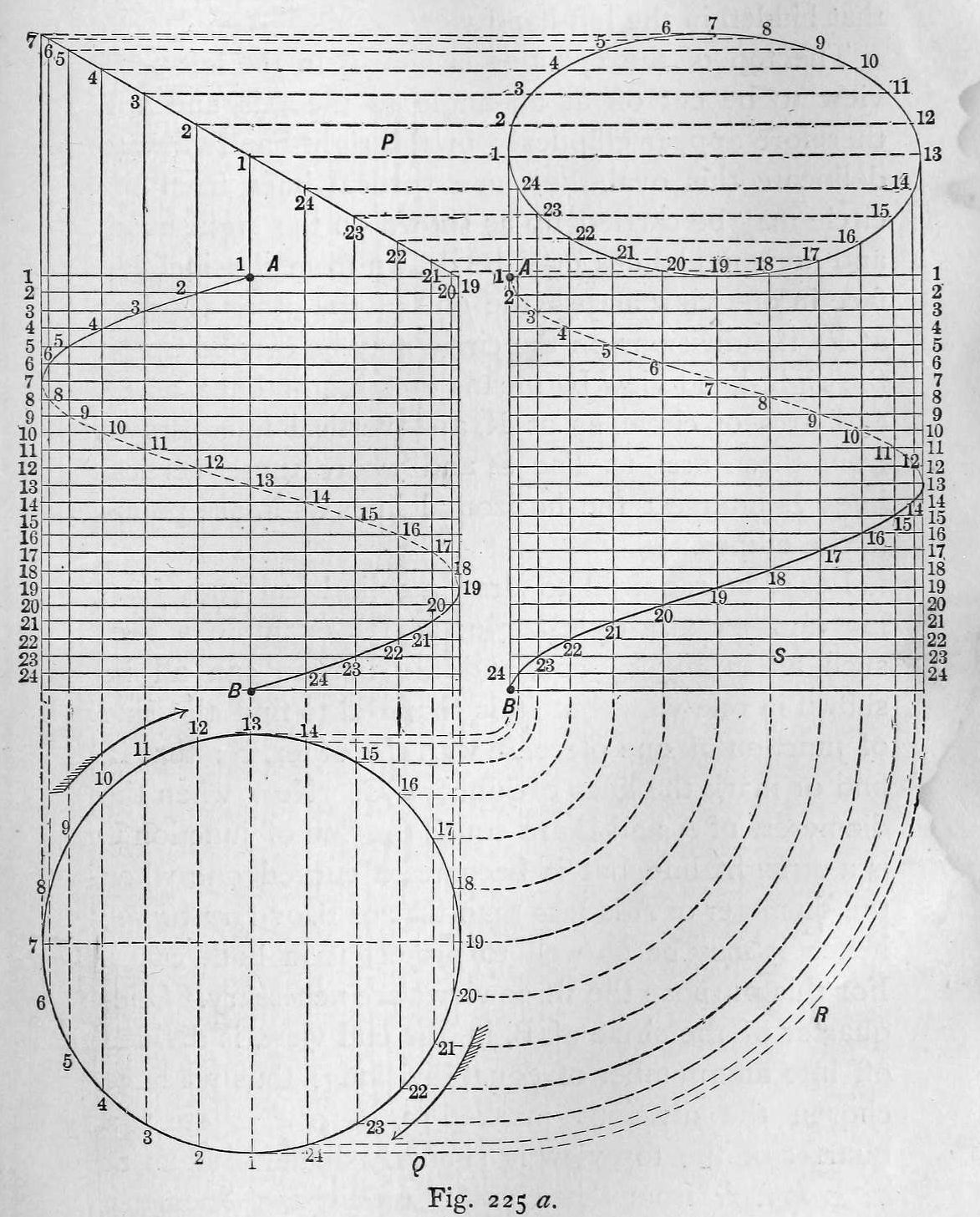
Mechanical Drawing Self-Taught, 1883: Figure 225a.

In projecting, Rose (1883) explained, the lines in one view are used to mark those in other views, and to find their shapes or curvature as they will appear in other views. Thus, in Figure 225a we have a spiral, wound around a cylinder whose end is cut off at an angle. The pitch of the spiral is the distance A B, and we may delineate the curve of the spiral looking at the cylinder from two positions (one at a right-angle to the other, as is shown in the figure), by means of a circle having a circumference equal to that of the cylinder.

The circumference of this circle we divide into any number of equidistant divisions, as from 1 to 24. The pitch A B of the spiral or thread is then divided off also into 24 equidistant divisions, as marked on the left hand of the figure; vertical lines are then drawn from the points of division on the circle to the points correspondingly numbered on the lines dividing the pitch; and where line 1 on the circle intersects line 1 on the pitch is one point in the curve. Similarly, where point 2 on the circle intersects line 2 on the pitch is another point in the curve, and so on for the whole 24 divisions on the circle and on the pitch. In this view, however, the path of the spiral from line 7 to line 19 lies on the other side of the cylinder, and is marked in dotted lines, because it is hidden by the [181] cylinder. In the right-hand view, however, a different portion of the spiral or thread is hidden, namely from [182] lines 1 to 13 inclusive, being an equal proportion to that hidden in the left-hand view.

== Selected publications ==
- Joshua Rose. The Complete Practical Machinist: Embracing Lathe Work, Vise Work, Drills, etc., Philadelphia: H.C. Baird & Co., 1876; 2nd ed. 1885.
- Joshua Rose. The pattern maker's assistant; embracing lathe work, branch work, core work, sweep work, and practical gear construction; the preparation and use of tools; together with a large collection of useful and valuable tables. New York: D. Van Nostrand Co., 1877.
- Joshua Rose. Key to Engines and Engine-running: A Practical Treatise Upon the Management of Steam Engines and Boilers..., New York: D. Van Nostrand Co., 1877.(1899)
- Joshua Rose. The slide valve practically explained. Embracing simple and complete practical demonstrations of the operation of each element in a slide-valve movement, and illustrating the effects of variations in their proportions, by examples carefully selected from the most recent and successful practice. 1880, 2nd ed. 1891.
- Matéaux, Clara L; Rose, Joshua, edJ. The wonderland of work. New York [etc.] Cassell Pub. Co, 1884.
- Joshua Rose. Mechanical drawing self-taught : comprising instructions in the selection and preparation of drawing instruments : elementary instruction in practical mechanical drawing : together with examples in simple geometry and elementary mechanism, including screw threads, gear wheels, mechanical motions, engines and boilers. 1883; 1889; 1891; (at gutenberg.org).
- Joshua Rose. Modern Steam Engines: An Elementary Treatise Upon the Steam Engine, Written in Plain Language; for Use in the Workshop as Well as in the Drawing, 1886; 2nd rev. ed. 1891.
- Joshua Rose. Modern machine-shop practice: operation, construction, and principles of shop machinery, steam engines, and electrical machinery, Volume I and II, Scribner's, 1887/88; 3rd ed. 1899.

== Patents ==
- 1869. Patent US87974 for rock drill
- 1878. Patent US205578 for improvement in chromatic tempering-scales
- 1890. Patent US205578 for Steam Enginege Valve improvement
