= Yoh Services =

American talent and outsourcing company

Yoh
- Company type: Subsidiary
- Industry: Talent and outsourcing
- Founded: 1940
- Headquarters: Philadelphia, Pennsylvania, U.S.
- Area served: Continental United States, Canada, UK, Germany
- Key people: Emmett McGrath (President)
- Revenue: US$ 374 million (2007)
- Number of employees: 4,000 (2007)
- Parent: Day & Zimmermann
- Website: www.yoh.com

Yoh Services LLC is an American talent and outsourcing company that is headquartered in Philadelphia, Pennsylvania. Yoh's primary services include temporary placement, direct hire, managed staffing services and outsourced solutions.

The company specializes in providing short- and long-term professionals for the information technology, scientific, clinical, engineering, health care, and telecommunications industries.

== History ==
Yoh was founded by Harold L. Yoh and his investment partners in 1940 as Duncan Tool Design, renamed to H.L. Yoh Company in 1946 after Yoh bought out his partners' shares. As the country's first temporary technical staffing firm, Yoh got its start staffing the United States government and private industry's engineering needs during World War II.

Yoh is a business unit in the larger company Day & Zimmermann, with which it merged in 1961.

It is headquartered in Philadelphia.
