= Hugo Diemer =

American engineer and management consultant

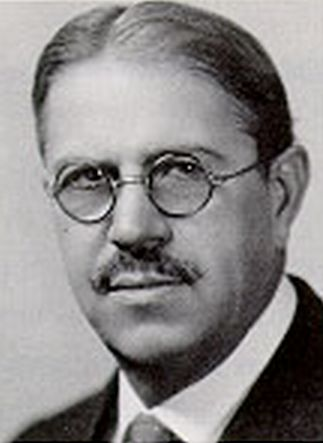
- Born: November 18, 1870; Cincinnati, Ohio
- Died: March 3, 1939 (aged 68); Chicago, Illinois
- Citizenship: American
- Occupation: Professor
- Employer: Penn State University
- Notable credit: Founder Department of Industrial Engineering

Hugo Diemer (November 18, 1870 – March 3, 1939) was an American engineer, management consultant, and professor at the Penn State University, who in 1910 published the first industrial engineering textbook: Factory Organization and Administration.

== Biography ==
=== Youth, education and early career ===
Born and raised in Cincinnati, Ohio, son of Theodore Diemer and Bertha (Huene) Diemer. After attending the local public school, Diemer started working. In 1892, at the age of 22, he started his studies in engineering at the Ohio State University, where he graduated in 1896.

Between 1896 and 1900 Diemer was production engineer and production manager with the Bullock Engineering and Manufacturing Company and afterwards with Westinghouse Electric and Manufacturing Company.

=== Later career ===
In 1900 he started his academic career as assistant professor of mechanical engineering at the Michigan State College, and continued at various universities and educational institutions

Late 1900s Diemer established the first course in industrial engineering at Penn State University, where he was recommended by Frederick Winslow Taylor. In 1909 Penn State established the Department of Industrial Engineering, with Diemer appointed as its first head.

In 1920 Diemer was appointed Director of Management Training at LaSalle Extension University, Chicago, where he served until his death in 1939. In the last decennia Diemer had served actively in many professional societies. In 1938 he had been awarded the Taylor Key, one of the highest awards of the Society for Advancement of Management.

=== Personal and Death ===
Diemer married Mabel N. Hudson on June 26. 1901, and they had four children. Theo. H. Diemer, Natalie E. Diemer, Dorothy A. Diemer, and Mary Diemer. Hugo Diemer died suddenly on March 3, 1939, at the age of 68.

== Work ==
=== Commercial Organization of the Machine Shop, 1900 ===
In 1900 Diemer published a series of six articles on the machine shop, entitled "Commercial Organization of the Machine Shop." These articles described:

- A systems for the classification of shop orders, working plans for securing speed, accuracy and economy in the progress of work through the shop
- In the production department, bills of material, the duties of material clerks, and the cheapening of manufacture by duplication.
- In the production department, storeroom management.
- In the production department, execution of the Work. The operation of the production department, and the actual execution of the work in the shop.
- Further discussion of the production department, with especial reference to accurate timekeeping, and
- The figuring of total costs.

=== A bibliography of works management, 1904 ===
In 1904 Diemer published a "Bibliography of Works Management" in the Engineering Magazine. This bibliography started with an editorial introduction, and gave a description of about two dozen works. Overall it pictures the historical development of works on factory management from the 1880s to the early 1900s. The only predecessor mentioned was an early work by Charles Babbage from 1832.

Diemer acknowledged, that these works originate from three branches of learning: engineering, accounting, and economics. Almost without exception the authors of the works listed were engineers, who "have added to their technical training and experience the essential knowledge of accounting and of economics, requisite to a comprehensive grasp of the problems of factory management." In total Diemer's 1904 bibliography listed 27 works by two dozen authors, and gave a short description of each publication.

This article was republished in full as last chapter in Diemer's 1910 "Factory organization and administration." In the 1921 revised editions of this work Diemer presented a revised bibliography. This biography was limited the description to some on the works of scientific management by Taylor and Gantt, and additional gave a listing of about 300 publications in the field.

=== Index to the literature of Industrial Engineering ===
Diemer's 1904 bibliography was supplemented with an index to the literature of Industrial Engineering prepared by the Editors of the Engineering Magazine.

This index listed about 15 subjects, with more than 400 articles listed:

- Apprenticeship (30)
- Cost keeping (53), depreciation (4), foundry (10), and Patterns (3)
- Drawing room (34)
- Wage systems (36), bonus systems (3), piece work (22), premium plan (28), and profit sharing (20)
- General management (140), Equipment and plant (33), Foundry (21)

In 1920 Harry George Turner Cannons published a "Bibliography of industrial efficiency and factory management," which contained about 3.500 referenced works. In this listing still a few dozen authors (most already mentioned by Diemer) published 5 or more publications, and thousands of people published one or some articles in the emerging field of Industrial Management.

=== Industrial engineering at Penn State University ===
At the turn of the 20th century, Penn State had developed a national reputation for its engineering curriculum, but industrial engineering was only beginning to emerge as an academic discipline. Noted efficiency expert Frederick Taylor recommended that university president James A. Beaver hire Hugo Diemer, a professor from the University of Kansas, in the hope that Diemer would create an industrial engineering curriculum at Penn State.

A two-year option was ready by 1908, and a four-year bachelor's degree program emerged the following year, the first of its kind in the world. At the time, courses consisted of modern industrial engineering fundamentals such as time and motion study, plant layout optimization, and engineering economics, in addition to courses on advertising and sales. The new department also took over the instruction of manual shop skills, including carpentry and metalworking.

== Publications ==
Diemer published many books on a range of management subjects, a selection:

- Diemer, Hugo. Automobiles: a practical treatise on the construction, operation, and care of gasoline, steam, and electric motor-cars, including mechanical details of running gear, power plant, body, and accessories, instruction in driving, etc. American School of Correspondence, 1909, 1912.
- Diemer, Hugo. Factory organization and administration. 1910, 1915, 1921, 1923, 1935, 1974, 1979
- Diemer, Hugo. Good place to work, 1921.
- Diemer, Hugo. Leadership; the third work manual of the Modern foremanship course, being the expression of practical foremen, assembled, organized, 1921.
- Diemer, Hugo. Cost control in the shop 1921.
- Diemer, Hugo. Wages and incentives; the eleventh work manual, Modern foremanship and production methods; the tested experience of practical production men, assembled, organized, 1921.
- Diemer, Hugo. What is production, and why? The twelfth work manual, Modern foremanship and production methods; the tested experience of practical production men.. 1921, 1940.
- Diemer, Hugo. Standardization and Scientific Management, 1923.
- Diemer, Hugo. Foremanship Training, McGraw-Hill book company, inc. in New York [etc.]. 1927.
- Diemer, Hugo. How to set up production control for greater profits, edited by Hugo Diemer. 1930.
- Diemer, Hugo. Flow of work; manual 6, Modern foremanship and production methods; the tested experience of production men, assembled, organized, and edited by Hugo Diemer, Meyer Bloomfield and Daniel Bloomfield. 1938, 1941.
- Diemer, Hugo. Foreman and the law 1941.

Articles, a selection:

- Diemer, Hugo. "Functions and Organization of the Purchasing Department", The Engineering Magazine, Vol. XVIII (March, 1900), pp. 833–36
- Diemer, Hugo. "Commercial Organization of the Machine Shop." A series of six articles, in The Engineering Magazine, June to Nov., 1900
- Diemer, Hugo. "Discussing a simple method of employing the card index and showing its advantages for inventory purposes." Engineering Magazine, Feb 1902.
- Diemer, Hugo. "Cost Finding Methods for Moderate-sized Shops." New York, 1903. Engineering Magazine, Vol. 24, pp. 577–589: Furnishes a working description of a practical system in actual use In a shop.
- Diemer, Hugo. "Thermal Diagrams and Their Practical Use." in: University of Kansas, Bulletin 1903. p. 227-233
- Diemer, Hugo. "The Fixing of Piece-work Rates." New York, 1903. Engineering Magazine, Vol. 26, pp. 169–176: Shows the determining of correct rates is the fundamental starting point of any system.
- Diemer, Hugo. "Bibliography of Works Management." New York, 1904. Engineering Magazine. Vol. 27. pp. 626–658.
- Diemer, Hugo. "Staff and Departmental Organization." Cleveland, 1904. Iron Trade Review, Vol. 37. pp. 74–75.
- Diemer, Hugo. "The Planning of Factory Buildings and the Influence of Design on Their Productive Capacity." Engineering News 50.24 (1904): 292–94.
- Perrigo, O. E., and Diemer, H. "Raising the Efficiency of Men and Machinery." Chicago, 1906. System, Vol. 9, pp. 426–432, 605–609; Vol. 10, pp. 277–284.
- Diemer, Hugo. "System in Control of Production." Chicago, 1907. Factory, Vol. 1, pp. 13–15, 43.
