= Day & Zimmermann =

American private construction company

Day & Zimmerman
- Type: Private
- Industry: Construction, staffing, defense
- Headquarters: Philadelphia, Pennsylvania, United States
- Area served: Worldwide
- Key people: Harold L. Yoh III (Chairman & CEO)
- Revenue: US$2.7 billion (2023)
- Owners: Hal, Mike and Bill Yoh
- Number of employees: 43,000
- Subsidiaries: Yoh Services
- Website: dayzim.com

Day & Zimmermann is a privately held company in the fields of construction, engineering, staffing and ammunition manufacture, operating out of 150 locations worldwide. Its corporate office is in Philadelphia, Pennsylvania.

Day & Zimmermann has an annual revenue of $2.5 billion, and is ranked by Forbes as one of the largest privately held companies in the United States. One of America's leading producers of ammunition, the company operates several government-owned facilities. In the 2011 financial year, it worked on 351 US Army contracts worth 151.8 million dollars.

== History ==
=== Early years ===
The company was founded in 1901 by Charles Day and Kern Dodge, son of James Mapes Dodge, as Dodge & Day, specializing in engineering, shop equipment and management. Later, the scope of the organization was enlarged to include a great deal of engineering and construction work in both the industrial and public-service fields.

In 1907 another former classmate John Zimmermann joined the firm as partner, and they renamed the firm Dodge, Day & Zimmermann. After Kern Dodge withdrew as partner in 1911 the firm became Day & Zimmermann, incorporated in 1916,

In its early years the company came into prominence with the design of the construction of the Gatun Lock System, one of the Panama Canal locks in 1907. The construction of the Gatun Lock began with the first concrete laid at Gatun, on August 24, 1909, by Day & Zimmermann. In 1914, the company was contracted by the Hershey chocolate company to produce the foil wrapping machines for Hershey's Kisses.

=== Merger with Yoh Services and later years ===
In 1961, Day & Zimmermann and Yoh Company merged, with Harold L. Yoh becoming president of Day & Zimmerman. In the early 1970s it assisted in the construction of Veteran's Stadium in Philadelphia.

In 1976, Spike Yoh bought the company from his father and was the CEO for twenty-two years. He had graduated from Duke University and one of Duke's facilities is named Duke's Yoh Football Center. In 1998, his son, Hal Yoh, became the company's leader. In that year Day & Zimmermann was the recipient of the National Family Business of the Year award.

=== Involvement in Israel-Palestine conflict ===
Day & Zimmermann is responsible for manufacturing much of the artillery munitions used by Israel in its ongoing invasion of Gaza. In particular, it manufactures 155mm rounds, fired by M109 howitzer guns, and 120mm M830A1 High Explosive Anti-Tank (HEAT) rounds, fired by Israel's Merkava battle tanks. The American Friends Service Committee says that Merkava tanks fired M830A1 rounds in a November attack on a UN school in Gaza, and in the attack that killed Hind Rajab, and that serial numbers on shells recovered at the scene suggest that the shells were made by Day & Zimmermann subsidiary Mason & Hanger.

== Selected publications ==
- Jeffrey L. Rodengen, Jon VanZile, Sandy Cruz, The Legend of Day & Zimmermann, 2001.
- H. Birchard Taylor, Charles Day (1879-1931) Symbol of American Industrial Genius. Newcomen Society of North America, 1953.
- Harold L. Yoh, Day & Zimmermann, Inc: Dedicated to Excellence for Eighty Years, 1901-1981, Newcomen Society in North America, 1981.
