= Plant layout study =

Layout study for a manufacturing plant

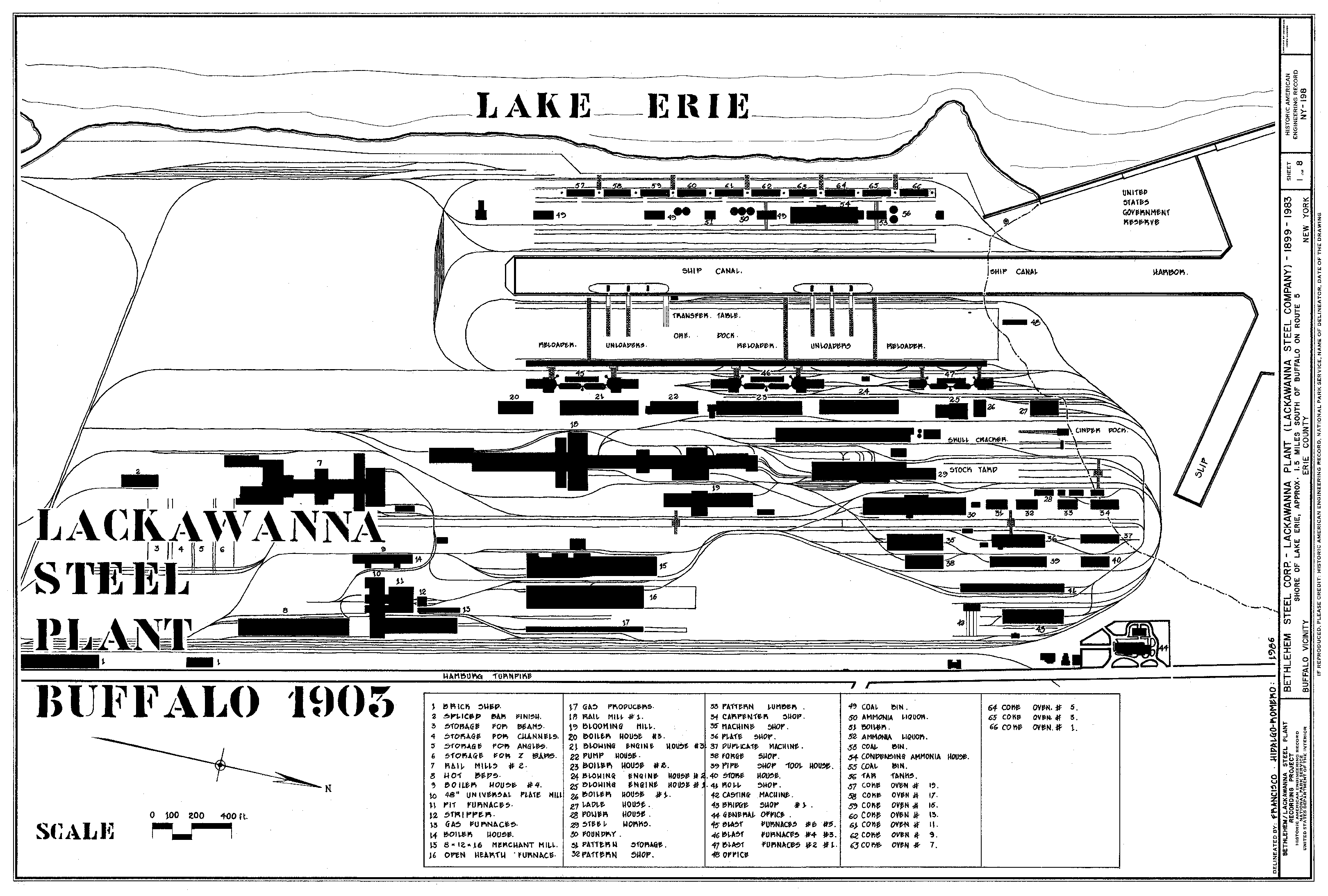
Lackawanna steel plant, 1903

A plant layout study is an engineering study used to analyze different physical configurations for a manufacturing plant. It is also known as facilities planning and layout.

== Overview ==
The ability to design and operate manufacturing facilities that can quickly and effectively adapt to changing technological and market requirements is becoming increasingly important to the success of any manufacturing organization. In the face of shorter product life cycles, higher product variety, increasingly unpredictable demand, and shorter delivery times, manufacturing facilities dedicated to a single product line cannot be cost effective any longer. Investment efficiency now requires that manufacturing facilities be able to shift quickly from one product line to another without major retooling, resource reconfiguration, or replacement of equipment.

Investment efficiency also requires that manufacturing facilities be able to simultaneously make several products so that smaller volume products can be combined in a single facility and that fluctuations in product mixes and volumes can be more easily accommodated. In short, manufacturing facilities must be able to exhibit high levels of flexibility and robustness despite significant changes in their operating requirements.

In industry sectors, it is important to manufacture the products which have good quality and meet customers’ demand. This action could be conducted under existing resources such as employees, machines and other facilities. However, plant layout improvement, could be one of the tools to response to increasing industrial productivity. Plant layout design has become a fundamental basis of today’s industrial plants which can influence parts of work efficiency. It is needed to appropriately plan and position employees, materials, machines, equipment, and other manufacturing supports and facilities to create the most effective plant layout.

The intended products to be manufactured influence the choice of layout.

== See also ==
- Routing diagram
