= Howard M. Raymond =

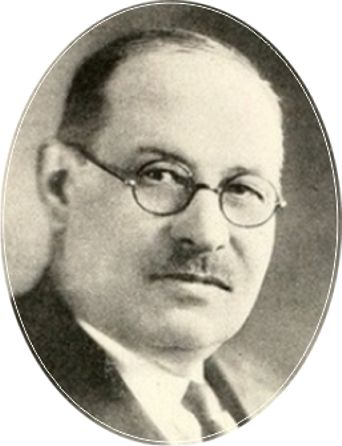
Howard M. Raymond.

Howard Monroe Raymond (October 25, 1872 – 1943) was an American physicist, Professor of Physics and President of the Armour Institute of Technology from 1892 to 1932, also known as the editor of the early 20th century Cyclopedia of Modern Shop Practice.

== Life and work ==
Born in Grass Lake, Michigan, Raymond received his BS and EE from the University of Michigan in 1893, where he continue with postgraduate work in Physics and Electrical Engineering two more years. In 1922 he received an ScD from the Colorado School of Mines.

Raymond spent his academic career at Armour Institute of Technology, where he started in 1895 as instructor of Physics, became Associate Professor in 1898, and Professor of Physics in 1903. From 1902 to 1927 he was also Dean of the Engineering department, and from 1922 to 1932 President of the Armour Institute of Technology.

According to the Illinois Institute of Technology (2008) "during his leadership, Raymond steered the school through some its most challenging financial years. The economy of the 1920s heavily impacted corporate support, including that of the founding Armour family. But a major rallying effort by the growing Alumni Association brought in much-needed and stabilizing income. Raymond also presided over a Board of Trustees agreement to merge Armour Institute with the School of Engineering at Northwestern. Approved in 1926, the plan called for ambitious fundraising and spending for new buildings prior to a merger. The plan was abandoned by 1929."

Raymond was Editor-in-chief of the Cyclopedia of Modern Shop Practice. where he was assisted by a corps of mechanical engineers, designers, and specialists in shop methods and management.

== Selected publications ==
- Raymond, Howard Monroe, ed. Cyclopedia of Modern Shop Practice. 1903/06/09. Vol, 1; Vol. 2; Vol. 3; and Vol. 4
- Raymond, Howard Monroe, ed. Cyclopedia of mechanical engineering: a general reference work on machine shop practice, tool making, forging, pattern making, foundry, work, metallurgy, steam boilers and engines, gas producers, gas engines, automobiles, elevators, refrigeration, sheet metal work, mechanical drawing, machine design, etc. Vol. 1-6. American technical society, 1910.

Articles, a selection:

- Raymond, Howard M. "Some Aspects of Technical Education with Especial Reference to the Teaching of Physics." School Science and Mathematics 5.1 (1905): 15-22.
