= American Machinist =

Machining trade publication

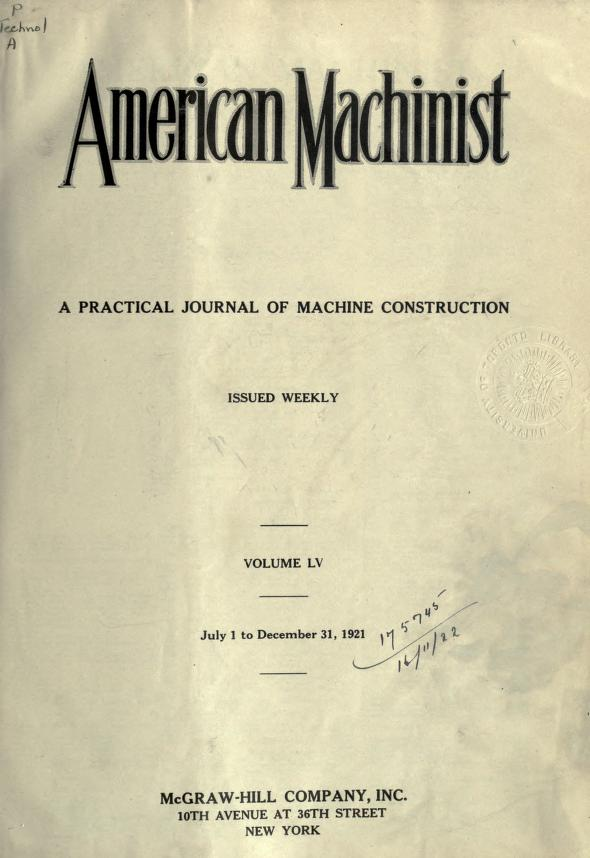
- Editor: Robert Brooks
- Categories: Machinery industries
- Frequency: Weekly
- Publisher: Endeavor Business Media
- Founded: 1877
- Final issue: 2013 (print)
- Country: United States
- Based in: New York City
- Website: americanmachinist.com
- ISSN: 1041-7958
- OCLC: 60637873

The American Machinist is an American trade magazine of the international machinery industries and most especially their machining aspects. Published since 1877, it was a McGraw-Hill title for over a century before becoming a Penton title in 1988. In 2013 it transitioned from combined print/online publication to online-only.

== History ==
The journal was founded as a monthly magazine in November 1877 by Horace B. Miller and Jackson Bailey at 96 Fulton Street in New York City. The publication moved to a weekly publication schedule in July 1879.

Fred H. Colvin explained:

The aim of its founders was to establish a trade publication that would reflect the changing conditions in the machine-building industry, and, as specialization and coordination of techniques progressed, to concentrate its efforts on the problems that belonged to the shops. New methods of management and new ideas in machining practice were to be studied, expounded, and encouraged. New materials (the modern science of metallurgy was as yet unborn) were to be discussed with reference to their application to better cutting tools, to welding, to methods of test, to problems of design, and to the overall problem of simplifying and standardizing tolerances, limits, and gauges in the entire industry. It should be mentioned that this was three years before the founding of the American Society of Mechanical Engineers—an event which, fittingly enough, actually took place in the old offices of the American Machinist at 96 Fulton Street.

In 1888, the editors decided to launch another title, specific to the railroading industry, called Locomotive Engineer. They asked Colvin's father, Henry F. Colvin, to recommend someone to become the new title's editor. He recommended an American Machinist correspondent from Pueblo, Colorado, whose writing he considered to be of good quality. The man was hired, and this introduction to technical publishing was auspicious, because John A. Hill went on to be a cofounder of McGraw-Hill.

American Machinist was published weekly from 1877 to 1960 by various New York City companies, from the original American Machinist Publishing Company, through John A. Hill's Hill Publishing Company, to McGraw-Hill from 1909 onward. From 1968 to 1988, McGraw-Hill issued it biweekly and later monthly, briefly titling it American Machinist & Automated Manufacturing during 1986–88. Starting in 1988 it was published by Penton; in 2013 it transitioned from combined print/online publication to online-only. Penton was acquired by Informa in 2016; Informa sold American Machinist as part of a batch of titles to Endeavor Business Media.

William Harris, a professor emeritus of Middlebury College, summarized that the American Machinist appeared weekly since "after the American Civil War, and was published continuously through the 19th and into the 20th century. This time period spans a very important interval, at the beginning of which new machinery began to appear in response to arms needs arising from the war, and the concept of mass production was invented. Interchangeable parts for military equipment followed immediately, and gave a new sense of what machines could do, in fact what they were going to have to do, as a matter of course in the future."

Long-time editors or coeditors included Frederick A. Halsey and Fred H. Colvin. Other editor-in-chiefs were Fred J. Miller, Leon P. Alford from 1911 to 1917, and John H. Van Deventer from 1917 to 1919.

For decades, American Machinist and several other key trade journals, including the Industrial Press's Machinery (of which Colvin was the founding editor), helped machinists, from machine tool builders and job shop operators to factory hands, to keep abreast of current practice and new developments in a way that they formerly had not. Both editorial offices also issued handbooks for machinists (American Machinists' Handbook and Machinery's Handbook).

In 1969 the American Machinist magazine, under editor-in-chief Anderson Ashburn, was awarded the National Magazine Award, for its special issue, “Will John Garth Make It?” The study of U.S. industry's role in combating unemployment, especially among those that companies might consider unemployable, included Mr. Garth, a 26-year-old high school dropout and parolee.

== See also ==
- American Machinists' Handbook
- Engineering
- Engineering Magazine
