= Machinist's handbook =

Machinist's handbook may refer to:

- Machinery's Handbook, a classic reference work in mechanical engineering and practical workshop mechanics
- American Machinists' Handbook, a similar reference book
