= Fred H. Colvin =

American machinist, technical journalist, author, and editor

Glass plate negative showing Colvin's design for an arbor press, July 1, 1900. From the digitized Fred H. Colvin Papers at Kelvin Smith Library, Case Western Reserve University, Cleveland, OH.

Fred Herbert Colvin (1867–1965) was an American machinist, technical journalist, author, and editor. He wrote, co-wrote, edited, or co-edited many periodical articles, handbooks, and textbooks related to engineering, machining, and manufacturing. His autobiography, Sixty Years with Men and Machines, provides a thorough and colloquial look into the decades of 1880 to 1950, giving insight into the culture of the Machine Age.

== Overview of career ==
Over the years, Colvin worked on both Alexander Luchars's journal Machinery (of which he was chief editor from its beginning in 1894 until 1897) and John A. Hill's journal American Machinist (which he worked on from 1907 until retirement in 1937, having been co-editor for many years). He came to the Hill Publishing Company (soon to become McGraw-Hill) in 1907 to work on the American Machinist, and in the subsequent decades, besides his work on the journal, he authored or coauthored dozens of McGraw-Hill monographs, textbooks, and reference books in the field of machining. His principal coauthor was Frank A. Stanley; their first book series together was the "Hill Kink Books" series of 1908, a collection of handy, practical advice for the machinist on the shop floor. (The word "kinks" in this context was used in the sense of "tips and tricks"; that sense of the word is rather obsolescent today and merits glossing.)

From 1908 to 1945, Colvin and Stanley coedited eight editions of American Machinists' Handbook, a McGraw-Hill reference book similar to Industrial Press's Machinery's Handbook. (The latter title, still in print and regularly revised, is the one that machinists today are usually referring to when they speak imprecisely of "the machinist's handbook" or "the machinists' handbook".)

Colvin was retired and in his 70s when World War II started, but he came out of retirement in order to help with the war production effort.

Colvin was the 1942 recipient of the Worcester Reed Warner Medal. In 1944 the Stevens Institute of Technology awarded him an honorary M.E. degree for his life's work in advancing the field.

Near the end of his life, Colvin worked on a history of the American machine tool industry, but he died before finishing.

== Memoir, poetry, and labor-relations titles by Colvin ==
=== Memoir ===
- Colvin, Fred H. (1947), Sixty Years with Men and Machines, New York and London: McGraw-Hill, LCCN 47003762. Available as a reprint from Lindsay Publications (ISBN 978-0-917914-86-7). Foreword by Ralph Flanders.

=== Poetry ===
- Colvin, Fred H. (1952). Safety valve: poems (1st ed.). New York: Exposition Press. OCLC 1394677.
- Colvin, Fred H. (1965). Safety valve: poems (2nd ed.). New York: Exposition Press. OCLC 3699762.

=== Labor-relations monographs ===
- Colvin, Fred H. (1919). Labor turnover, loyalty and output: a consideration of the trend of the times as shown by the results of war activities in the machine shops and elsewhere. New York, NY, US and London, UK: McGraw-Hill. OCLC 512539.
- Colvin, Fred H. (1955). The industrial triangle. Columbia, Connecticut, US: Columbia Graphs. OCLC 3112769.

== Bibliography ==
- Colvin, Fred H. (1947), Sixty Years with Men and Machines, New York and London: McGraw-Hill, LCCN 47003762. Available as a reprint from Lindsay Publications (ISBN 978-0-917914-86-7). Foreword by Ralph Flanders.
