= G. Charter Harrison =

Anglo-American management consultant and cost accountant (1881-1959)

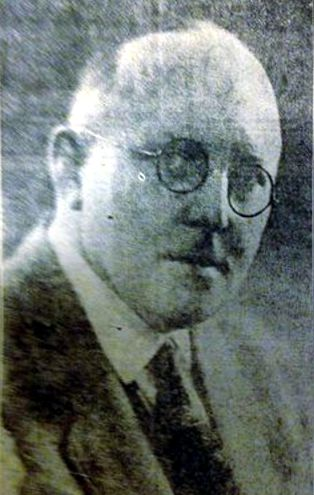
G. Charter Harrison

George Charter Harrison (1881 – 1959) was an Anglo-American management consultant and cost accounting pioneer, known for designing one of the earliest known complete standard cost systems.

== Biography ==
G. Charter Harrison was born and educated in England and passed eighth in order of merit in the final examination of the Institute of Chartered Accountants in England and Wales. For eight years, up to October, 1916, he was employed by Price, Waterhouse & Company in various capacities: during the latter part of this period as manager of the system division of that firm. From January, 1909, to February, 1911, he was comptroller for the Russell, Burdsall and Ward Bolt & Nut Company. At the latter date he returned to Price, Waterhouse & Company to take up the managership of the system division.

In November, 1916, he entered into partnership with the principals of Baker, Sutton & Company, London, England, chartered accountants, under the firm name of Baker, Sutton & Harrison, practicing in New York City. Owing to conditions brought on by the war that firm dissolved in May, 1918. Harrison took out the business and continued it under his own name. In those days Harrison was known as a merchandising expert, and a member of the National Retail Hardware Association.

Chatfield summarized that in 1911 Harrison "designed the earliest known complete standard cost system. He elaborated on this system in a series of articles, "Cost Accounting to Aid Production" (1918–1919). His descriptions of accounts, ledgers, and cost analysis sheets were detailed enough to be applied in cookbook fashion."

Harrison is also noted as one of the foremost pioneers of interest costs, with J. Lee Nicholson, William Morse Cole, John R. Wildman, DR Scott, D. C. Eggleston, and Thomas H. Sanders. He is also credited with coining the term "fixed budgeting."

== Work ==
Harrison is characterized as a propagandist in the great field of productive industry. He recognized that the "objective of industry is the production of goods, that everything that hampered the productive process should be eliminated, that impatience with a factory system or detail that hindered, or at least did not help, production was natural, and that cost accounting, instead of being static in accumulating history, should be an active part of the great process of production."

=== Cost accounting in the "new industrial" day, 1919 ===
Harrison condemned the attitude of many of his fellow accountants, telling them that their practice was twenty-five years behind the times, that they were making themselves slavishly subservient to a financial condition in industry that must pass away, and said to them that if cost accounting was to hold its own among the business professions, it must turn over a new leaf and prepare to serve in "The New Industrial Day."

Looking through the form and semblance of things Harrison declared, further, that cost accounting was unworthy of any place in industry if it did not contribute to production, and, not content with stopping at this point, he re-enforced his challenge by pointing out better and improved methods, by showing the way in which cost accounting could become an aid to production.

In all this work Harrison has endeavored to stimulate and arouse the thinking of men, realizing that as the years pass greater progress can be secured by this means than by working for the adoption of any particular accounting scheme or plan. In a series of articles published in Industrial Management in 1918 and 1919, he developed the advantages, in fact the necessity, of predetermined costs. Then he showed how to establish cost standards and use them to control costs in the making. He also developed the theory of standardized cost formulas and presented a number of these arranged in such a manner that the little skilled office employee would be able to work out accurate results in carrying forward a cost accounting system based on the determination of standard costs and the comparison of actual costs with these standards.

Alford (1921) stipulated that "all of this work has the touch of stern reality, for Mr. Harrison has applied these methods in his own consulting practice and in widely different industries, so far apart as the tonnage production of steel and the building of complex agricultural machinery."

=== Cost Accounting to Aid Production, 1921 ===
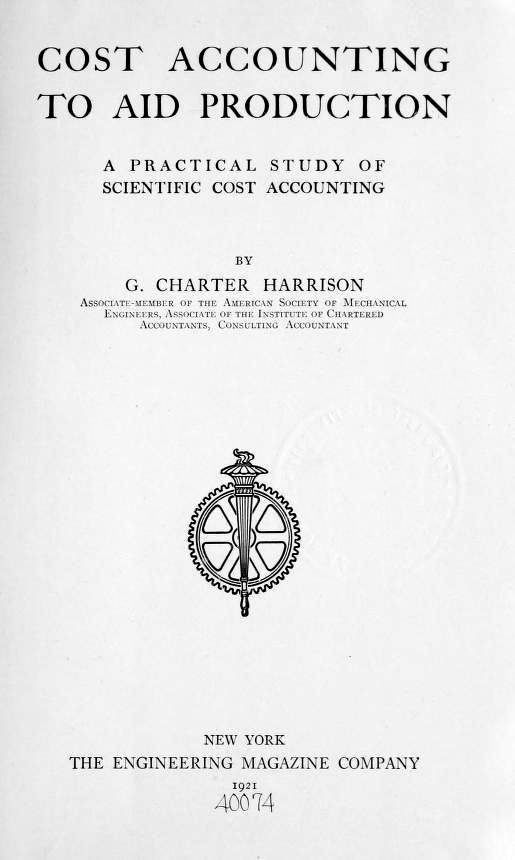
Cost accounting to aid production, 1911

In the preface to "Cost Accounting to Aid Production" by Leon P. Alford, Alford summarized that many of the early efforts at industrial management were inspired by the needs of the accounting function of a manufacturing business. It was realized that a knowledge of costs was essential in meeting competition and in making sure that the business was stable. So, many of the attempts at bettering industrial organization and management sprang out of an effort to secure accurate costs. But generally speaking, professional accountants seem to have failed to fit their own work into the broad scheme of productive industry. And this has been permitted in spite of the teachings of many of the engineers who first entered the industrial field and who were compelled to develop cost accounting as one branch of their own work.

Notably Frederick W. Taylor and Harrington Emerson, Alford continued, developed cost work, and wrote emphasizing the place of importance that costs occupy in the general scheme of management in industry. During the first decades of the 20th century there has been a gradual widening of the divergence of viewpoint between many of the leaders in management and engineering and cost accounting. The engineers have been working under tremendous pressure. Production has been the keynote of all their efforts and the demand for goods has been insistent and insatiable. Under these circumstances it has been quite natural to reach out for every possible help to increase and improve the productive process. So engineers have wanted cost accounting methods that would aid in reaching toward the great objective of industry.

In contrast, the cost accountants have seemed to be solely interested in securing accurate costs, according to Leon P. Alford. They refined cost history of what has actually taken place in the processes and operations of production. In the midst of this separation of viewpoints, this lack of harmony between men with objective and subjective minds, came the writing and work of a chartered accountant, with some twenty years of professional experience of which some fourteen years have been spent in the United States and who boldly supports the point of view of the engineers.

=== The Universal Law of the System ===
In the third article of the Cost Accounting to Aid Production series, entitled "The Universal Law of the System", Harrison states emphatically that there must be a cost accounting system if the cost accounting of a business is to be properly done; that the procedure must be carefully planned to attain the desired ends; and that this planning must be done by someone who knows how. By way of illustration a diagram is given showing the basic features of a simple cost system for a business manufacturing various kinds of machines of a standard character (see image).

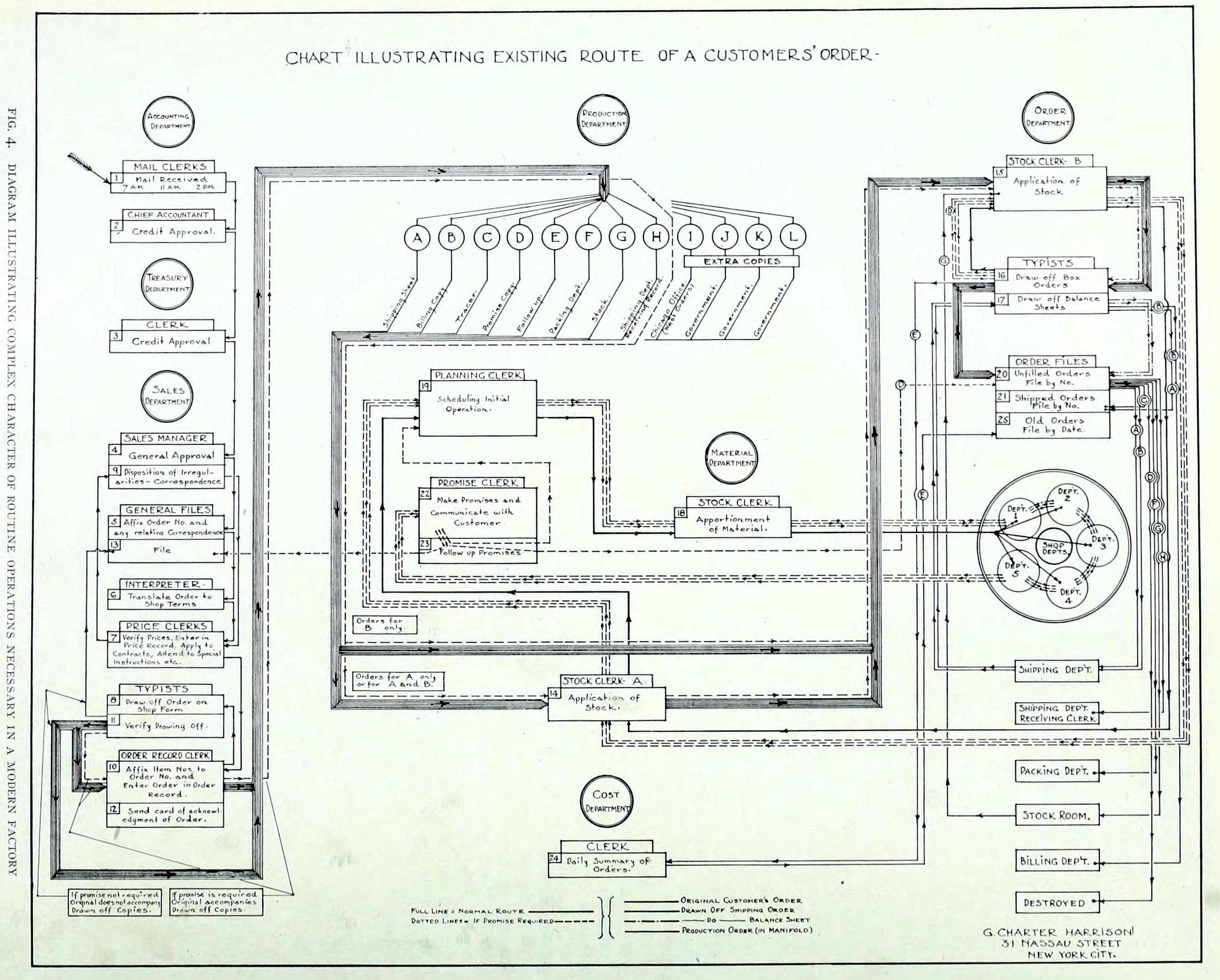
Diagram illustrating method of charting routine operations, 1921

Harrison first explained why, in his days, business methods fall short. He states that it is rarely in a large business, that any person can be found who is able to completely recite the routine followed in the handling of an order from its receipt in the mail throughout all the intermediate operations up to the final shipping and billing of the material, nor is it often found that any attempt has been made to analyze such routine with a view to eliminating duplication of work and overlapping of authority. Under such conditions it is hardly to be wondered that the methods employed fall far short of the ideal.

As an illustration of the ramifications involved in the modern manufacturing institution there is shown in the figure a representation of the operations involved in the handling of an order in a concern where the requirements though complex are not by any means exceptional. A consideration of this diagram, which covers only a small section of the routine work of a large organization, will indicate how extremely difficult it would be for the average mind to visualize clearly the innumerable relations and operations involved in the conduct of modern business without the assistance of drawings illustrating these in complete detail.

Unless the practice of machine design is followed and all the parts of the plan or scheme and their various interrelationships are clearly shown on paper, it is practically impossible to determine where the routine employed involves duplication of authority and effort and working at cross-purposes, where methods of check are defective or overlap and where essential requirements are overlooked and non-essentials introduced. Due to the absence of such diagrams, the conception in the mind of the average shop or office employee of the methods employed in the operation of a business outside of his own immediate duties is little more than a blur and this applies to the ordinary routine work of an office, to the methods of accounting employed and to the system of controlling the progress of work throughout the shops. It would be difficult to overestimate the educational value of a series of diagrams illustrating all of the routine of the business rendering it possible for every member of the organization to obtain an intelligent conception of the business as a whole and of the relationship of his particular work to the general plan.

=== Procedure in Planning Routine Work ===
About the "Procedure in Planning Routine Work" Harrison further explained:

In laying out any plan of routine work the logical procedure to be followed is to first clearly define the ends which it is desired to attain and then to determine the simplest and most effective means of realizing them.

This statement would seem so obvious, according to Harrison, that it may be thought that this plan would be followed in a general way by every man of intelligence, but the author has come across cases where years have been spent in an endeavor to introduce satisfactory cost-finding methods by men who at no time have possessed anything more than the vaguest idea of what they were endeavoring to achieve.

To minds like these, the reverse of the logical procedure is followed; instead of laying down a general plan and then formulating the details to fit, they start out with small refinements here and there, trusting ultimately, doubtless, to be able to coordinate these disconnected ideas in one grand plan. It is not by any means unusual to find cost accountants who have endeavored to develop such refinements in burden distribution that an attempt is made to apportion the cost of heat and light to departments and sub-departments, but who have overlooked such essentials as control of raw material.

Harrison gives an example of one case where a store accounting system was introduced under which it was necessary for one clerk to devote his entire time to keeping track of the cost of bolts, nuts, and screws which involved an expenditure of considerably less than his salary, and yet under this plan several hundred thousand dollars of other material was shown on the books as being on hand when as a matter of fact it had been used in the manufacture of product shipped and billed months before.

== Selected publications ==
- Harrison, George Charter. Cost Accounting to Aid Production: A Practical Study of Scientific Cost Accounting. Engineering magazine Company, 1921.
- Harrison, George Charter. Standard costs: installation, operation and use. Ronald Press Company, 1930.
- American Management Association, and George Charter Harrison. New Approaches to the Sales Problem. American Management Association, 1937.

Articles, a selection

- Harrison, George Charter. "Cost Accounting to Aid Production", in: Industrial Management, 1918/19
  - "I: Application of Scientific Management Principles", Vol 56, No. 4 (Oct. 1918) p. 273-282
  - "II: Standards and Standard Costs", Vol 56, No. 4 (Oct. 1918) p. 391-398
  - "III: The Universal Law of System", Vol 56, No. 5 (Dec. 1918) p. 456-464
  - "IV: The Principle of Burden Distribution." Vol 57, No 1 (Jan. 1919). p. 49-55
  - "V: Co-operation and Co-ordination." Vol 57, No 2 (Feb. 1919). p. 131-139
  - "VI: Importance of Deliberation in Introducing Changes." Vol 57, No 3 (March 1919). p. 218-224
  - "VII: Extension of Application of Scientific Management Principles." Vol 57, No 4 (April 1919). p. 314-321
  - "VIII: Cost Accounting and the Sales Manager." Vol 57, No 5 (May 1919). p. 400-404
  - "IX: Conclusion and the Future of Cost Accounting." Vol 57, No 6 (Jun. 1919). p. 483-487
- Harrison, G. Charter (1919). "Cost accounting in the 'new industrial' day". Industrial Management. 58: 441–44.
- Harrison, G. C. 1920. "Scientific Basis for Cost Accounting." Industrial Management (March): 237—242
- Harrison, G. C. (1921). "What is wrong with cost accounting?". Publications of Accounting Associations, Societies, and Institutes. 94: 3–10.
