= Franklin D. Jones =

American author (1879–1967)

Franklin Day Jones (1879–1967) was an author in mechanical engineering and toolmaking. He wrote the first edition of Machinery's Handbook (1914, Industrial Press), with engineer Erik Oberg. Jones's writings emphasized the importance of relating theories of mechanics to practical applications.

Theoretical physicist John Archibald Wheeler recalled being influenced by Jones's work at an early age.

== Works ==
- Machinery's Handbook (1914, 1st ed., Industrial Press, with Erik Oberg)
- Planing and Milling (1914, Industrial Press)
- Machinery's Encyclopedia (1917, with Erik Oberg)
- Shop management and systems (1918, Industrial Press)
- Turning and Boring (1915, Industrial Press)
- Ingenious Mechanisms for Designers and Inventors (1930)
- Machine Shop Training Course, (1964, 5th ed., Industrial Press)
