= Alexander Luchars =

Alexander Luchars (fl. 1894) was an American publishing executive, originally from Scotland, who founded Industrial Press, a large publisher of scientific and technical content, such as textbooks and reference books.

Luchars started a monthly magazine called Machinery in competition with other similar magazines in the metalworking field in 1894. (Although the history page on Industrial Press's own website says that Machinery was started "in about 1880", both the Library of Congress's catalog and the autobiography of Machinery's first chief editor, Fred H. Colvin, place its beginning in 1894.)

In 1914, the first edition of Machinery's Handbook was published.
