= Fred J. Miller =

American mechanical and industrial engineer

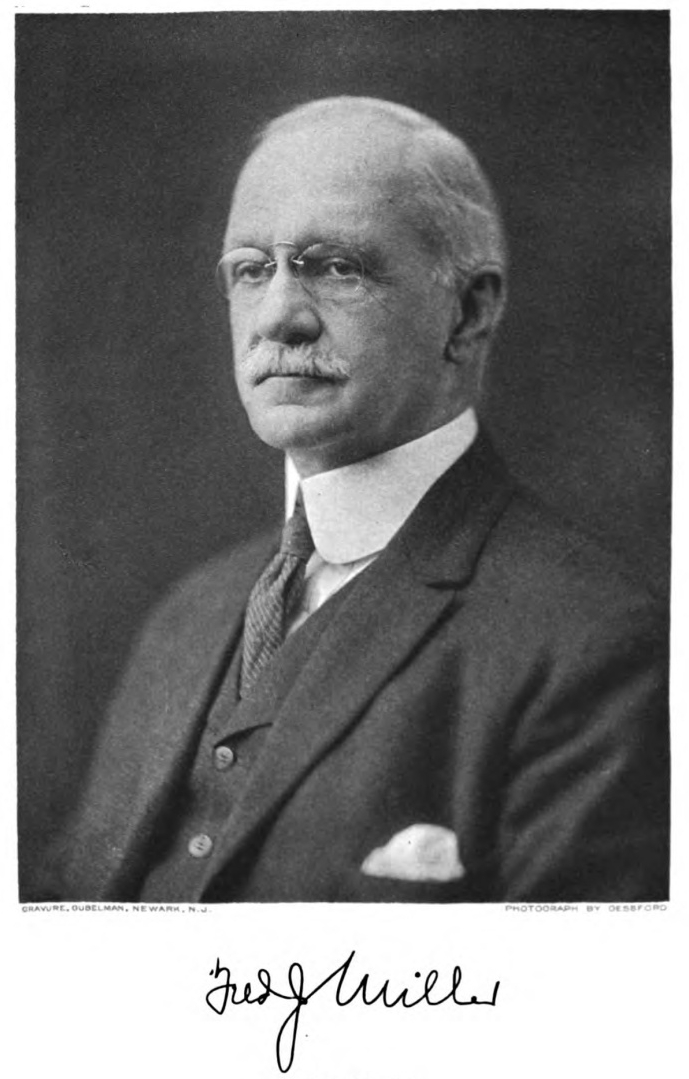
Fred J. Miller c. 1920

Fred J. Miller (January 3, 1857 – November 26, 1939) was an American mechanical and industrial engineer, known for his seminal work in designing high-precision scientific instruments, and as president of the American Society of Mechanical Engineers in 1920–21.

== Biography ==
Born in Yellow Springs, Ohio, in 1857, Miller was the eldest son of son of John Z. Miller and Elizabeth (Woodhurst) Miller. His father was a skilled general mechanic, who worked as contractor. After his public school education, Miller became a regular apprentice at a machine shop.

Miller started his career as toolmaker at the firm of Benjamin H. Warder in Springfield, Ohio, and worked his way up to foreman. He started to invent tools and devices for the machine tool industry contribute to mechanical journals, of which some became used in leading manufacturers. Also he started to write articles, and in 1887 became full-time editor of the American Machinist machinery journal, editor-in-chief, and eventually vice-president of the publisher.

After twenty years in the publishing business, he returned to industry as general manager of typewriter factory. After nine years he was appointed Major of Ordnance at the U.S. Army at the Rock Island Arsenal, the Arsenals in Washington, and rolled into the staff of the Secretary of War.

Miller was president of the American Society of Mechanical Engineers in the year 1920–21, Fellow of the American Association for the Advancement of Science, and recipient of the Gantt Medal.

He died in Trenton, New Jersey, on November 26, 1939.

== Publications ==
- Fred J. Miller, Census of manufactures: 1905. Metal working machinery.
- Fred J. Miller, Labor, management and production.

=== Publications about Fred J. Miller ===
- ASME. "Biography of Fred J. Miller," Transactions of the American Society of Mechanical Engineers, Vol 43. 1921; p. x
- ASME. Fred J. Miller: A Biography of a Man who Hoped Never to Grow So Old that a New Idea Would Shock Him. 1941
