= Index of mechanical engineering articles =

This is an alphabetical list of articles pertaining specifically to mechanical engineering. For a broad overview of engineering, please see List of engineering topics. For biographies please see List of engineers.

== A ==
Acceleration – Accuracy and precision – Actual mechanical advantage – Aerodynamics – Agitator (device) – Air handler – Air conditioner – Air preheater – Allowance – American Machinists' Handbook – American Society of Mechanical Engineers – Ampere – Applied mechanics – Antifriction – Archimedes' screw – Artificial intelligence – Automaton clock – Automobile – Automotive engineering – Axle – Air Compressor

== B ==
Backlash – Balancing – Beale Number – Bearing – Belt (mechanical) – Bending – Biomechatronics – Bogie – Brittle – Buckling – Bus-- Bushing – Boilers & boiler systems BIW--

== C ==
CAD – CAM – CAID – Calculator – Calculus – Car handling – Carbon fiber – Classical mechanics – Clean room design – Clock – Clutch – CNC – Coefficient of thermal expansion – Coil spring – Combustion – Composite material – Compression ratio – Compressive strength – Computational fluid dynamics – Computer – Computer-aided design – Computer-aided industrial design – Computer-numerically controlled – Conservation of mass – Constant-velocity joint – Constraint – Continuum mechanics – Control theory – Corrosion – Cotter pin – Crankshaft – Cybernetics –

== D ==
Damping ratio – Deformation (engineering) – Delamination – Design – Diesel Engine – Differential – Dimensionless number – Diode – Diode laser – Drafting – Drifting – Driveshaft – Dynamics – Design for Manufacturability for CNC machining –

== E ==
Elasticity – Elasticity tensor - Electric motor – Electrical engineering – Electrical circuit – Electrical network – Electromagnetism – Electronic circuit – Electronics – Energy – Engine – Engineering – Engineering cybernetics – Engineering drawing – Engineering economics – Engineering ethics – Engineering management – Engineering society – Exploratory engineering –

== F ==
( Fits and tolerances)--- Factor of safety – False precision – Fast fracture – Fatigue – Fillet – Finite element analysis – Fluid mechanics – Flywheel – Force – Force density – Four-stroke cycle – Four wheel drive – Friction – Front wheel drive – Fundamentals of Engineering exam – Fusible plug – Fusion Deposition Modelling – forging

== G ==
Gas compressor – Gauge – Gauge (engineering) – Gauge, rail – Gear – Gear coupling – Gear ratio – Granular material –

== H ==
Heat engine – Heat transfer – Heating and cooling systems – Hinge – Hooke's law – Hotchkiss drive – HVAC – Hydraulics – Hydrostatics –

== I ==
Ideal machine – Ideal mechanical advantage – Imperial College London – Inclined plane – Independent suspension – Inductor – Industrial engineering – Inertia – Institution of Mechanical Engineers – Instrumentation – Integrated circuit – Invention –

== J ==
Joule – Junction

== K ==
Kelvin – Kinematic determinacy – Kinematics –

== L ==
Laser – Leaf spring – Lever – Liability – Life cycle cost analysis – Limit state design – Live axle – Load transfer – Locomotive – Lubrication –

== M ==
Machine – Machine learning – Magnetic circuit – Margin of safety – Mass transfer – Materials – Materials engineering – Material selection – Mechanical advantage – Mechanical Biological Treatment – Mechanical efficiency – Mechanical engineering – Mechanical equilibrium – Mechanical work – Mechanics – Mechanochemistry – Mechanosynthesis – Mechatronics – Micromachinery – Microprocessor – Microtechnology – modulus of rigidity-- Molecular assembler – Molecular nanotechnology – Moment – Moment of inertia – Motorcycle – Multi-link suspension

== N ==
Nanotechnology – Normal stress – Nozzle –

== O ==
(orientation)--Overdrive – Oversteer –

== P ==
Pascal (unit) – Physics – Pinion – Piston – Pitch drop experiment – Plasma processing – Plasticity – Pneumatics – Poisson's ratio – Position vector – Potential difference – Power – Power stroke – Pressure – Prime mover – Process control – Product Lifecycle Management – Professional Engineer – Project management – Pulley – Pump –

== Q ==
Quality – Quality control-- quality assurance

== R ==
Rack and pinion – Rack railway – Railcar – Rail gauge – Railroad car – Railroad switch – Rail tracks – Reaction kinetics – Rear wheel drive – Refrigeration – Reliability engineering – Relief valve – RepRap Project – Resistive force – Resistor – Reverse engineering – Rheology – Rigid body – Robotics – Roller chain – Rolling – Rotordynamics –

== S ==
Safety engineering – Screw theory – Seal – Semiconductor – Series and parallel circuits – Shear force diagrams – Shear pin – Shear strength – Shear stress – Simple machine – Simulation – Six-stroke engine – Slide rule – Society of Automotive Engineers – Solid mechanics – Solid modeling – Sprung mass – Statics – Steering – Steam Systems – Stress–strain curve – Structural failure – Student Design Competition – Surveying – Suspension – Switch –

== T ==
Technical drawing – Technology – Tensile strength – Tensile stress – Testing Adjusting Balancing – Theory of elasticity – Thermodynamics – Toe – Torque – Torsion beam suspension – Torsion spring – Toughness – Tramway track – Transmission – Truck – Truck (railway) – Turbine – Tribology – touch screen – tear – Tire manufacturing--

== U ==
Understeer – Unibody – Unsprung weight –

== V ==
Verification and Validation – Valve – Vector – Vertical strength – Viscosity – Volt – Vibration – Velocity diagrams –

== W ==
Weapon - Wear – Wedge – Weight transfer – Wheel – Wheel and axle – Wheelset –

== X ==
x bar charts

== Y ==
Yield (strength) – Young's modulus –

== Z ==
Zeroth law of thermodynamics
