= Locomotive engineer =

Locomotive engineer may refer to:

- Locomotive builder, a person who designs and builds locomotives
- Train driver, a person who operates a locomotive
- Locomotive Engineer, an American periodical begun in 1888 and edited by John A. Hill
