= John H. Van Deventer =

American engineer and inventor

John Herbert Van Deventer (April 24, 1881 – March 5, 1956) was an American engineer, inventor, trade journal editor, and writer on engineering, management, and accounting. In the field of accounting Van Deventer contributed to the theory of discounted cash flow. During World War I he served as editor-in-chief of the American Machinist.

== Biography ==
Born in Paramus, New Jersey to John Cornelius Van Deventer and Eliza Jane King, Van Deventer was educated as mechanical engineer. In 1903 he obtained his degree in mechanical engineering from Sibley College, Cornell University, with the dissertation, entitled "Mechanical Refrigeration: A Comparison of the Theories and Results of Several Systems."

Van Deventer started his career in industry. In 1905 he became superintendent of production, and cost manager, at the pump factory Goulds Manufacturing Company in Seneca Falls. In 1907 he moved to the Buffalo Forge company, where he became general superintendent and factory manager.

In 1915 Van Deventer joined the Engineering Management Company, where he became associate editor of the American Machinist, of Industrial Management, and of Industry Illustrated. From 1917 to 1919 he was Editor-In-Chief of the American Machinist, and from 1921 to 1926 president of the Engineering Management Company. In 1927 he moved to the McGraw Hill Publishing company, where he started as consulting editor. There he was editor for The Iron Age from 1930 to 1940, and editorial director from 1939 to 1946. The last three years he was also Business Papers Industry. In 1950 he retired.

Furthermore Van Deventer was a member of the American Society of Mechanical Engineers, and of the New York Business Publishing association, where he was chairman in 1923/24 and president in 1924/25.

== Selected publications ==
- Van Deventer, John H. Handbook of Machine Shop Management. McGraw-Hill book Company, Incorporated, 1915.
- Van Deventer, John H. Success in the small shop (1916, 2nd ed. 1918).
- Van Deventer, John Herbert, et al. Manufacture of artillery ammunition. McGraw-Hill Book Company, Incorporated, 1917.
- Van Deventer, John H. Making the small shop profitable, (1918).
- Van Deventer, John H. Industrial management's Cost control committee plan; detailed instructions for its organization and operation. 1922.

Articles, a selection:

- Van Deventer, John H. "Planning production for profit; tested and selected methods of planning production," Engineering magazine Company(1921).
- Van Deventer, John H. "What Ford is doing and how he does it." Industrial Management 64 (1922): 130.

== Patents ==
- 1911. US Patent 996169 for Rotary engine.
- 1912. US Patent 1026887 for rotary engine.
- 1912. US Patent 1046687 for rotary engine.
- 1913. US Patent 1070087 for metallic packing.
- 1918. US patent 1276454 for an equipment-index.
- 1931. US Patent 1808695 for walking toy.
