= Leon P. Alford =

American mechanical engineer and organizational theorist (1877–1942)

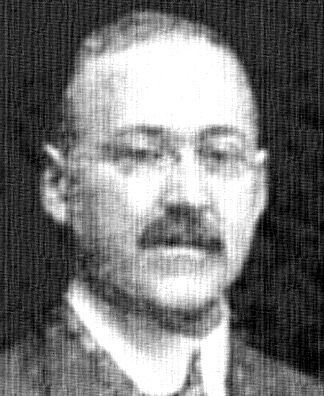
- Leon P. Alford
- Born: Leon Pratt Alford; Jan. 3, 1877; Simsbury, Connecticut, U.S.
- Died: January 2, 1942 (aged 64); New York City, U.S.
- Education: Worcester Polytechnic Institute
- Occupations: Industrial engineer, editor, author
- Known for: Contributions to industrial management
- Spouse: Grace Hutchins (m. 1900)
- Awards: Melville Medal (ASME) (1927); Henry Laurence Gantt Medal (ASME) (1931)

Leon Pratt Alford (January 3, 1877 – January 2, 1942) was an American industrial engineer, organizational theorist, editor, and author. He was known for his seminal work in the field of industrial management.

== Biography ==
Born in Simsbury, Connecticut, Alford graduated from the High School of Plainville, Connecticut. He received his bachelor's degree in electrical engineering from the Worcester Polytechnic Institute in 1896. After ten years in the industry in various functions, he received his master's degree from Worcester Polytechnic Institute in 1905.

In 1896 Alford started as shop foreman at the McKay Metallic Fastening Assn. in Boston, which merged into McKay-Bigelow Heeling Assn. in 1897. After another two years as shop foreman, he found employment as production superintendent at the United Shoe Machinery Corporation in 1899 in Boston. The United Shoe Machinery Corporation, formed in 1899 out of the merger of three shoe machinery companies, developed revolutionary new shoemaking equipment, which revolutionized the shoe industry. The company employed 9,000 workers and in its best days supplied 85% of all shoemaking machines in the United States. In 1902 Alford was promoted to mechanical engineer, and invented and patented some new constructions for the United Shoe Machinery Corporation.

In 1907 Alford started working in engineering journalism for the Engineering Magazine company. From 1907 to 1911 he was engineering editor at the American Machinist, and from 1911 to 1917 editor-in-chief. Subsequently, he was editor for the Industrial Management from 1917 to 1920, from 1921 to 1923 editor for Manufacturing Industrial Management, and from 1923 to 1928 consulting editor for the Factory and Industrial Management and vice-president of the Ronald Press Company in New York. Alford co-developed the theory called systematic management, and was an advocate of this management style within the American Society of Mechanical Engineers (ASME).

In 1929, Herbert Hoover appointed a president's commission to investigate the current state of the economy. Alford served on this panel and was the principal co-author of the committee's report, Recent Economic Changes (1929). In 1932, Alford received a doctorate in engineering from Worcester Polytechnic Institute. From 1935 to 1937 he joined the Federal Communications Commission, where he was assistant engineer-in-charge of the manufacturing costs unit. In 1937 Alford joined the faculty of New York University, where he became chairman of the department of administrative engineering.

Alford was elected fellow of the American Society of Mechanical Engineers (ASME) and was its former vice-president, and fellow of the Institute of Management and its former president. He was awarded the first ASME Melville Medal in 1927 and in 1931 the Henry Laurence Gantt Medal from the ASME. ASME elected him an honorary member in 1941.

== Work ==
=== Systematic management and scientific management ===
Alford was a practitioner of systematic management and an advocate of this management style within the American Society of Mechanical Engineers. This system of management principles, partly based on the ideas of Charles Babbage and developed together with Alexander Hamilton Church, would pave the way to modern industrial management. Their views clashed with the scientific management approach advocated by Frederick Winslow Taylor. In 1912, Alford published a critique of scientific management that undermined Taylor's claims of success.

Alford argued that labor efficiency improvements at the Philadelphia plant of the Link-Belt Company were due to the personality of the company's president, James Mapes Dodge. Dodge had won much respect and trust from the workers because of arrangements and incentives he offered so that they would accept Taylor's changes.

Later in 1912, Alford sat on the ASME committee that considered whether or not to publish Taylor's book, The Principles of Scientific Management. Alford's criticisms of Taylor and his management techniques moderated the committee's position on the text. Because the committee's report was ambivalent about the merits of Scientific Management, the ASME declined to publish Taylor's book.

=== Industrial management ===
Alford published his own management text, Industrial Management. He advocated a reformist approach to labor and to unionism. In 1920, he co-founded the Management Division within the ASME. Alford advocated flexibility in "industrial relations" and "human engineering" and rejected fixed and rigid approaches to labor management such as scientific management. His approach to labor soon became the dominant accepted practice of corporate liberal management. Because of this approach, the Management Division soon became the largest division within the ASME.

== Selected publications ==
Books, a selection:

- Alford, Leon Pratt. Bearings and their lubrication (1911)
- Alford, Leon Pratt. Manufacture of artillery ammunition, (1917)
- Alford, Leon Pratt. Ten Years Progress in Management. American Society of Mechanical Engineers, 1922.
- Alford, Leon Pratt, ed. Management's handbook: by a staff of specialists. The Ronald press company, 1924.
- Alford, Leon Pratt. Laws of management applied to manufacturing. Hive Publishing Company, 1928; 1981.
- Alford, Leon Pratt. Henry Laurence Gantt: Leader in Industry. Harper & brothers, 1934
- Alford, Leon Pratt. Principles of industrial management. Ronald Press Company, 1940; 1951.
- Alford, Leon Pratt, and John Robert Bangs, eds. Production handbook. Ronald Press Co., 1948.

Articles, a selection:

- Alford, Leon P. "Scientific Management in Use." American Machinist 36 (April 4, 1912): 550.
- Alford, L. P., and A. H. Church. "Principles of Management." American Machinist 36 (May 30, 1912): 857–862.

== Patents ==
- 1909, Patent US936690, Fixture-support for concrete-steel constructions.
