= American Machinists' Handbook =

Engineering reference work (published 1908–1945)

American Machinists' Handbook was a McGraw-Hill reference book similar to Industrial Press's Machinery's Handbook. (The latter title, still in print and regularly revised, is the one that machinists today are usually referring to when they speak imprecisely of "the machinist's handbook" or "the machinists' handbook".)

The somewhat generic sound of the title American Machinists' Handbook, no doubt contributed to the confounding of the two books' titles and identities. It capitalized on readers' familiarity with American Machinist, McGraw-Hill's popular trade journal. But the usage could have benefited from some branding discipline, because of some little confusion over whether the title was properly "American Machinist's Handbook" or "American Machinists' Handbook". ("American Machinist 's Handbook" would be parallel to the construction of the title "Machinery's Handbook")

McGraw-Hill's American Machinists' Handbook appeared first (1908). It is doubtful that Industrial Press's Machinery's Handbook (1914) was a mere me-too conceived afterwards in response. The eager market for such reference works had probably been obvious for at least a decade before either work was compiled, perhaps the appearance of the McGraw-Hill title merely prodded Industrial Press to finally get moving on a handbook of its own.

American Machinists' Handbook, co-edited by Fred H. Colvin and Frank A. Stanley, went through eight editions between 1908 and 1945. In 1955, McGraw-Hill published The new American machinist's handbook. Based upon earlier editions of American machinists' handbook, but perhaps the book did not compete well enough with Machinery's Handbook. No subsequent editions were produced.

== List of the editions of American Machinists' Handbook ==
Year	Coeditors	Title ± subtitle	Edition number	City, Publisher	Notes
1908	Fred H. Colvin, Frank A. Stanley	American machinists' handbook and dictionary of shop terms: a reference book of machine shop and drawing room data, methods, and definitions	1st ed	New York and London, Hill	This edition is public-domain (copyright expired) and can be read for free in digitized form via Google Book Search.
1914	Fred H. Colvin, Frank A. Stanley	American machinists' handbook and dictionary of shop terms: a reference book of machine shop and drawing room data, methods, and definitions	2nd ed	New York and London, McGraw-Hill	This edition is public-domain (copyright expired) and can be read for free in digitized form via Google Book Search.
1920	Fred H. Colvin, Frank A. Stanley	American machinists' handbook and dictionary of shop terms: a reference book of machine shop and drawing room data, methods, and definitions	3rd ed	New York and London, McGraw-Hill	This edition is public-domain (copyright expired).
1926	Fred H. Colvin, Frank A. Stanley	American machinists' handbook and dictionary of shop terms: a reference book of machine shop and drawing room data, methods, and definitions	4th ed	New York and London, McGraw-Hill	This edition is public-domain (copyright expired).
1932	Fred H. Colvin, Frank A. Stanley	American machinists' handbook and dictionary of shop terms: a reference book of machine shop and drawing room data, methods, and definitions	5th ed	New York and London, McGraw-Hill	Copyright renewed 1959-12-07
1935	Fred H. Colvin, Frank A. Stanley	American machinists' handbook and dictionary of shop terms: a reference book of machine shop and drawing room data, methods, and definitions	6th ed	New York and London, McGraw-Hill	Copyright renewed 1963-05-06
1940	Fred H. Colvin, Frank A. Stanley	American machinists' handbook and dictionary of shop terms	7th ed	New York and London, McGraw-Hill	Copyright renewed 1967-11-03
1945	Fred H. Colvin, Frank A. Stanley	American machinists' handbook and dictionary of shop terms: a reference book of machine-shop and drawing-room data, methods, and definitions	8th ed	New York and London, McGraw-Hill	Copyright renewed 1963-05-06
1955	Fred H. Colvin, Frank A. Stanley	The new American machinist's handbook. Based upon earlier editions of American machinists' handbook	1st ed	New York and London, McGraw-Hill	Note the apostrophe usage in the title. Copyright renewed 1955-07-26

Renewal data from Rutgers. All works after 1923 with renewed copyright are presumably still protected.
