= Industrial management =

Branch of engineering

Industrial management is a branch of engineering which creates management systems and integrates engineering processes. Industrial management uses industrial design, construction, management, and application of scientific and engineering principles to improve the industrial infrastructure and processes. Industrial managers can be said to be responsible for the proper and most efficient interaction of "the 4Ms": man, material, machine and method.

Industrial management also involves the study of the performance of machines. Specialists are employed to keep machines in good working condition and to ensure the quality of their production. The flow of materials through the plant is supervised to ensure that neither workers nor machines are idle. Constant inspection is made to keep output up to standard.

The term industrial company is generally applied to a manufacturing firm that, contrary to a crafts business, produces consumer durables in factories from raw materials in mass and serial production (a division of labor) using modern manufacturing machines.

== Industrial managers ==
An industrial manager utilizes the principles of manufacturing system, logistics, supply chain management, materials management, and entrepreneurship, among other things to plan how to efficiently and economically use resources. An industrial manager also creates new systems to solve waste and inefficiency problems.

== Courses of study ==
Study programs in industrial management are very popular in economies with a high value of manufacturing output, such as the United States and Germany. German research universities especially incorporate a large number of advanced courses in engineering in their graduate program in industrial management and are thus more like Master of Engineering programs. Degree programs are also offered under the title "industrial administration".

== See also ==
- Outline of management
