= John A. Hill =

American engineer, publisher and businessman

- Born: John Alexander Hill; February 22, 1858; Bennington, Vermont, US
- Died: January 24, 1916 (aged 57); New York, New York, US
- Occupations: Editor, publisher, railroad engineer

John Alexander Hill (February 22, 1858 – January 24, 1916) was a co-founder of the McGraw-Hill Book Company, the predecessor corporation of today's S&P Global and McGraw-Hill Education.

== Biography ==
c. 1900

John A. Hill was born in Bennington, Vermont on February 22, 1858.

In the 1880s, prior to entering the publishing business, he owned and operated machine shops and worked as a railroad engineer. Beginning in 1888, Hill worked as an editor at Locomotive Engineer, and over the next few years he would produce several technical and trade publications. In 1896, he became president of the American Machinist Press.

From 1900 to 1902 he served as mechanical engineer for the General Manifold Company, custom-designing machinery. In 1902, he formed his own company, The Hill Publishing Company, As head of Hill Publishing, he printed five weekly magazines: American Machinist, Power, Engineering News, The Engineering and Mining Journal, and Coal Age.

Hill had known James H. McGraw, who had established The McGraw Publishing Company in 1899, for some time, and the two men shared similar interests. In 1909 they agreed upon an alliance and combined the book departments of their publishing companies into The McGraw-Hill Book Company. Hill served as president of this combined company from 1909 to 1916, the year he died unexpectedly of a heart condition.

The following year, the remaining parts of Hill's company merged with McGraw's to form The McGraw-Hill Publishing Company, which later became The McGraw-Hill Companies.

== Books ==
- Stories of the Railroad (1899)
- Some of the Writings of John A. Hill (1916)
