= Machinery's Handbook =

Reference work for mechanical engineering

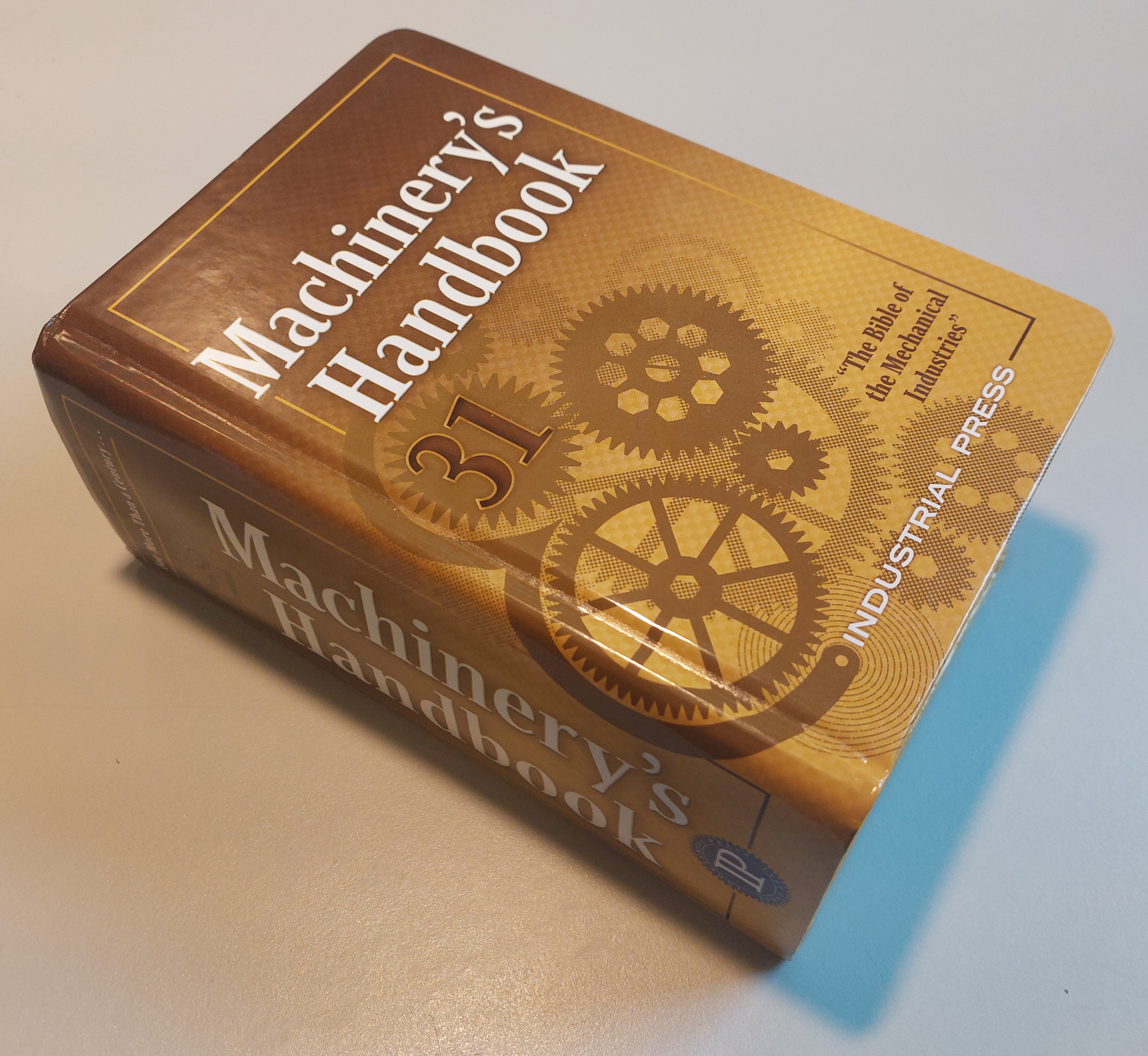
Machinery's Handbook 31st Edition, 2020

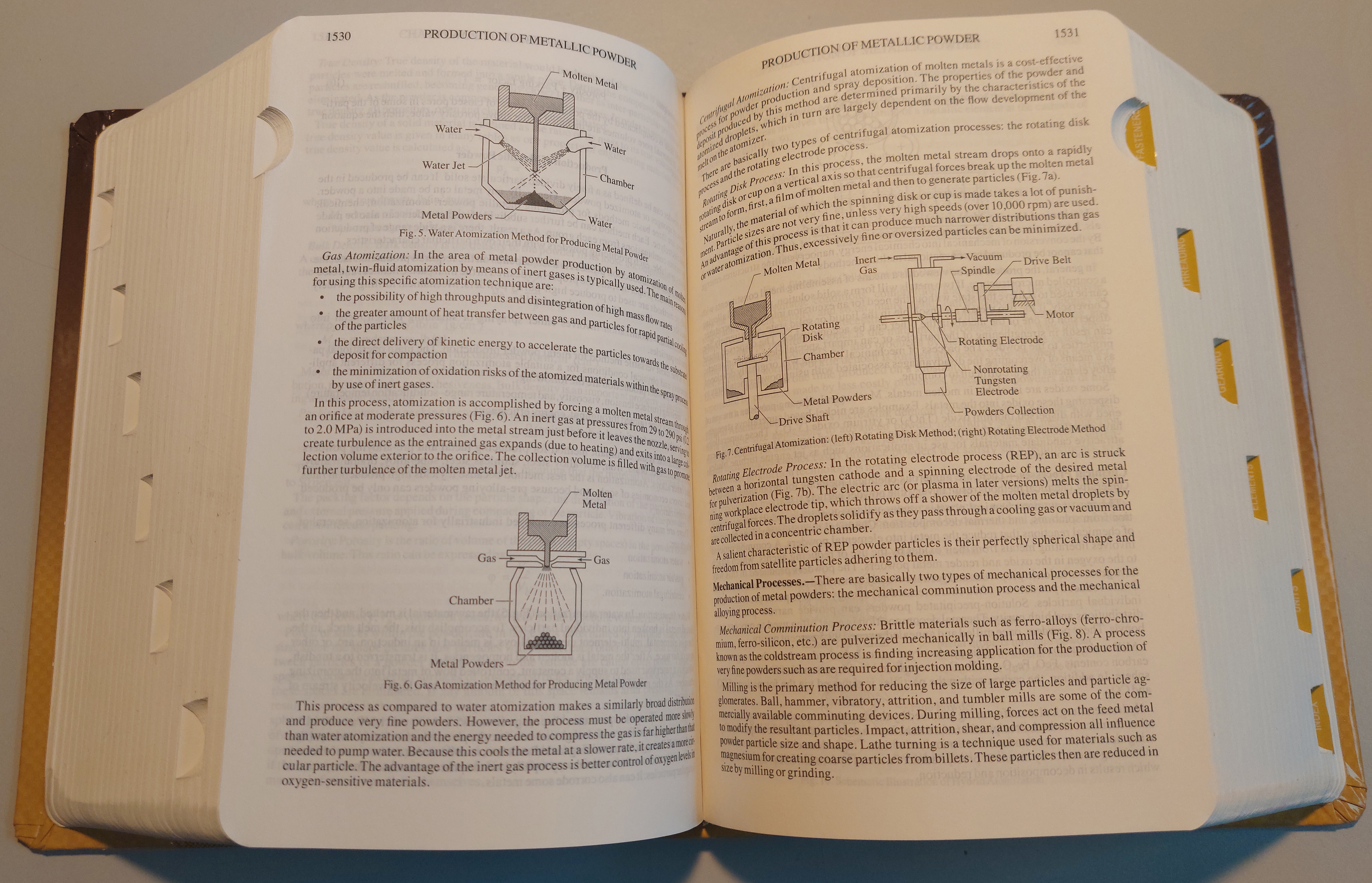
"Production of Metallic Powder", Machinery's Handbook 31st Edition, 2020

Machinery's Handbook for machine shop and drafting-room; a reference book on machine design and shop practice for the mechanical engineer, draftsman, toolmaker, and machinist (the full title of the 1st edition) is a classic reference work in mechanical engineering and practical workshop mechanics in one volume published by Industrial Press, New York, since 1914. The first edition was created by Erik Oberg (1881–1951) and Franklin D. Jones (1879–1967), who are still mentioned on the title page of the 29th edition (2012). Recent editions of the handbook contain chapters on mathematics, mechanics, materials, measuring, toolmaking, manufacturing, threading, gears, and machine elements, combined with excerpts from ANSI standards. Machinery's Handbook is still regularly revised and updated; the most current revision is Edition 32 (2024). It continues to be the "bible of the metalworking industries" today. The work is available in online and ebook form as well as print.

During the decades from World War I to World War II, McGraw-Hill published a similar handbook, American Machinists' Handbook, which competed directly with Industrial Press's Machinery's Handbook. McGraw-Hill ceased publication of their guide after the 8th edition (1945). Another short-lived spin-off appeared in 1955.

Machinery's Handbook is the inspiration for similar works in other countries, such as Sweden's Karlebo handbok (1st ed. 1936).

== Machinery's Encyclopedia ==
In 1917, Oberg and Jones also published Machinery's Encyclopedia in 7 volumes. The 7th volume was augmented with supplements to the previous 6 volumes in 1925. The handbook and encyclopedia are named after the monthly magazine Machinery (Industrial Press, 1894–1973) where the two were consulting editors.

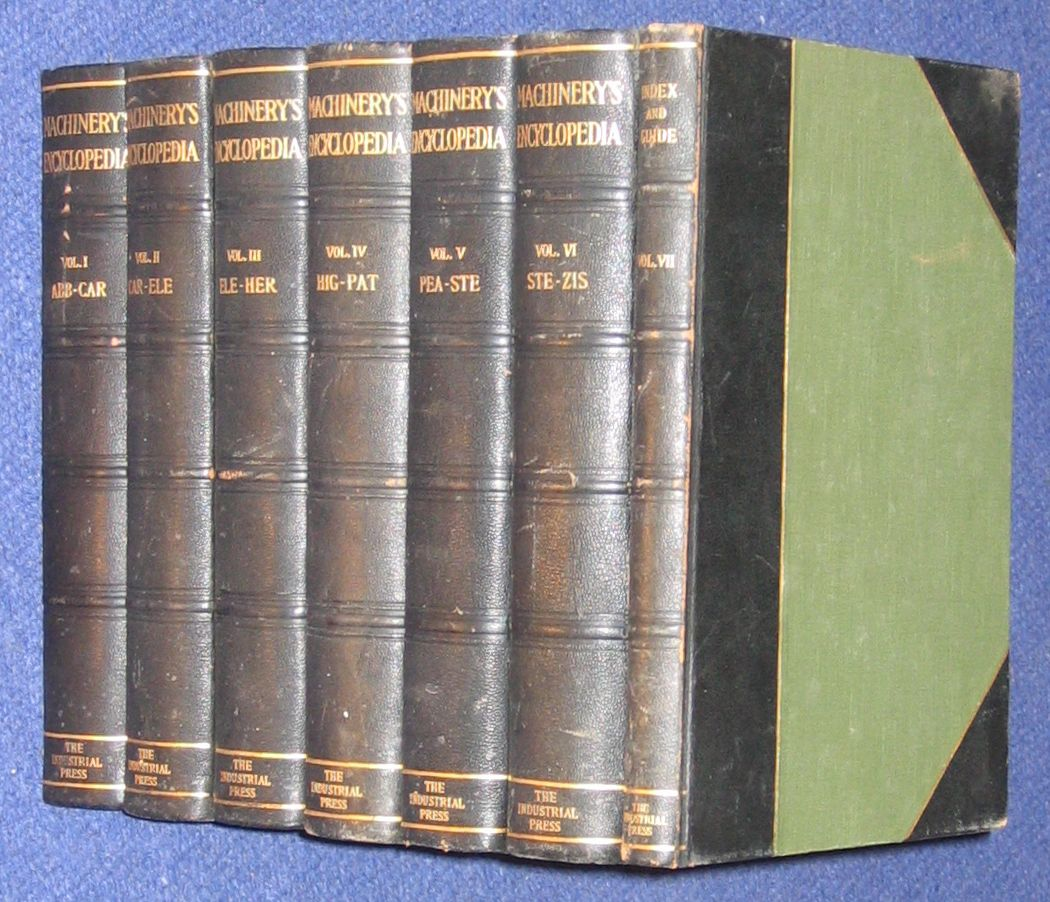
Machinery's Encyclopedia, 1917

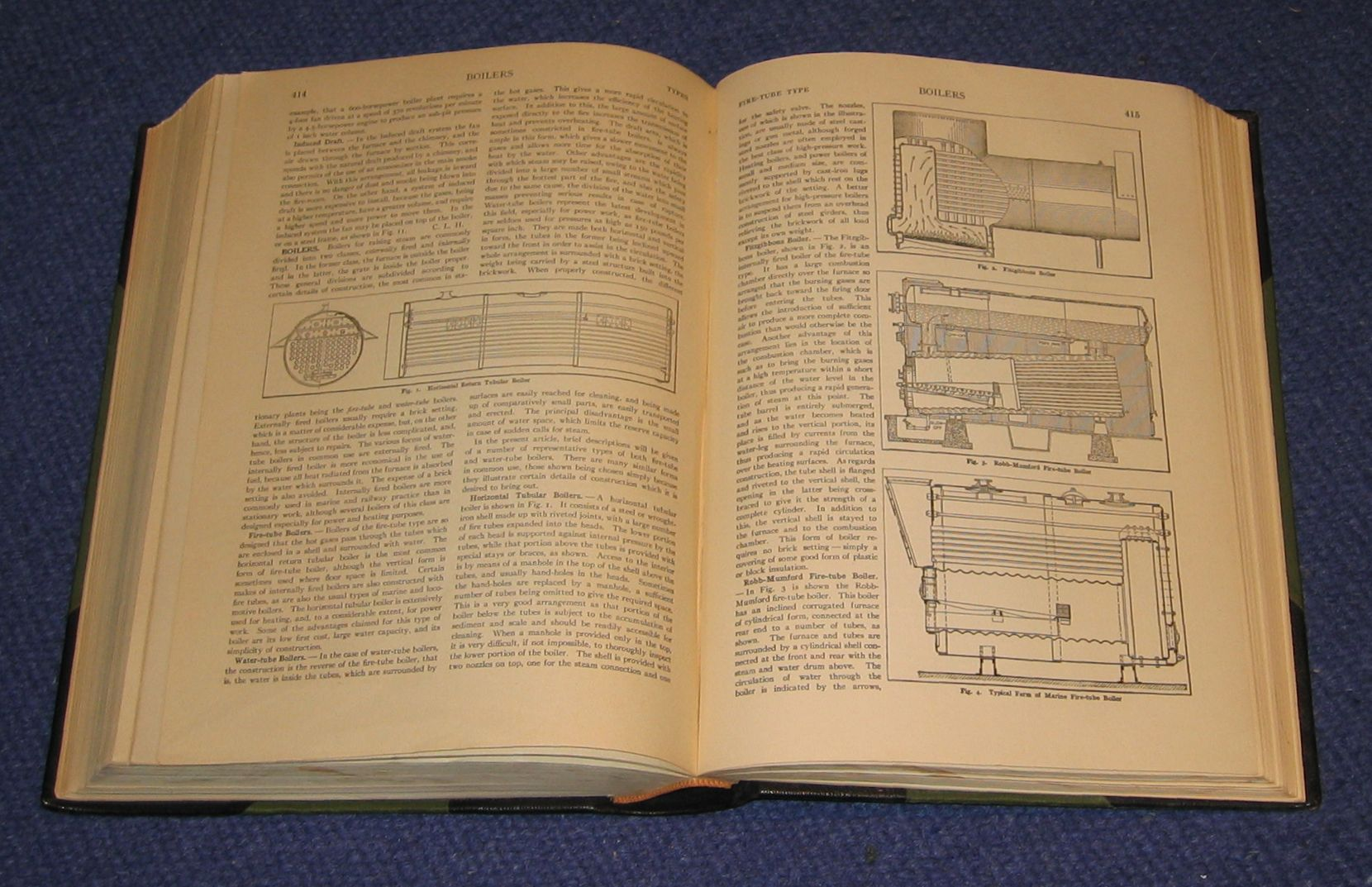
"Boiler", Machinery's Encyclopedia, 1917

== See also ==
- Machinist Calculator
- Kempe's Engineers Year-Book
