= Industrial Press =

American technical literature publisher

Industrial Press, Inc.
- Company type: Private company
- Industry: Publishing
- Founded: New York City (1883)
- Headquarters: South Norwalk, Connecticut (since 2013)
- Area served: Global
- Website: www.industrialpress.com

Industrial Press, Inc., is a privately held corporation headquartered in South Norwalk, Connecticut. Its primary areas of business are publishing technical books for engineering, technology, and manufacturing.

The company was founded in New York City in 1883, and moved to Connecticut in 2013.

Industrial Press's flagship title is the Machinery's Handbook. It is a reference for mechanical and manufacturing engineers, designers, draftsmen, toolmakers, and machinists.
