= Dissanaike =

Dissanaike (Sinhala: දිසානායක) is a Sinhalese family name. It is one romanization of දිසානායක, the most common romanization being "Dissanayake". Notable people with the family name include:

- George Dissanaike (1927–2008), Sri Lankan academic
- Gishan Dissanaike, British Sri Lankan economist
- Senesh Dissanaike Bandara, Sri Lankan film director
- Stanley Dissanaike (1925-2015), Sri Lankan parasitologist
