= Christoph Loch =

Christoph Loch MAE
- Occupation: Academic

Academic background
- Education: University of Tennessee (MBA); Stanford University (PhD)

Academic work
- Discipline: Operations management
- Sub-discipline: Technology management
- Institutions: INSEAD; Cambridge Judge Business School; IESE Business School

Christoph H. Loch is a German management scholar and professor of operations and technology management at IESE Business School. He was director (dean) of Cambridge Judge Business School from 2011 to 2021 and remained a professor there until 2024. His research concerns innovation management, project management and behavioural aspects of operations management. He became editor-in-chief of Management Science in January 2024.

== Education ==
Loch received a Diplom-Wirtschafts-Ingenieur, a joint qualification in mechanical engineering and business, from the Darmstadt Institute of Technology in 1985. He earned an MBA from the University of Tennessee, Knoxville, in 1986 and a PhD from the Stanford Graduate School of Business in 1991, specialising in decision sciences and operations management. In 2010, he completed a diploma in clinical organisational psychology at INSEAD.

== Career ==
Loch joined INSEAD in 1994 as an assistant professor of technology management, became an associate professor in 1997 and was promoted to professor of technology and operations management in 2001. From 2006 to 2011, he held the GlaxoSmithKline Chair of Corporate Innovation.

At INSEAD, Loch served as associate dean of the doctoral programme from 2006 to 2009 and directed the Edmond de Rothschild research centre in Caesarea, Israel, from 2008 to 2011. He also held visiting appointments at Hewlett-Packard Laboratories in 2002–2003 and the Stockholm School of Economics in 2009–2010.

In 2011, Loch joined the University of Cambridge as professor of operations and technology management and director (dean) of Cambridge Judge Business School. He served as director until 2021, when he was replaced by Professor Mauro Guillén and continued as a professor until 2024. During 2023–2024, he was also a visiting professor at Peking University HSBC Business School in Shenzhen.

Loch joined IESE Business School, part of the University of Navarra, as a chaired professor of operations and technology management in 2024.

Loch became editor-in-chief of Management Science, a journal published by the Institute for Operations Research and the Management Sciences (INFORMS), in January 2024.

Outside academia, Loch served on the board of directors of the professional football club Cambridge United from 2016 to 2025.

== Research ==
Loch's research examines how organisations select, coordinate and manage innovation projects. His work on new product development addresses communication between development teams, overlapping engineering activities, testing design alternatives and allocating resources across research and development projects.

Another area of his research concerns projects characterised by complexity and unforeseen uncertainty. With collaborators including Michael T. Pich, Arnoud De Meyer and Svenja Sommer, he has studied how learning, experimentation and flexible project processes can be used when objectives or circumstances change during a project. With De Meyer and Pich, he co-authored Managing the Unknown: A New Approach to Managing High Uncertainty and Risk in Projects (2006). He subsequently published articles in academic journals and publications for management practitioners.

Loch also studies behavioural aspects of operations management, including the roles of emotions, social preferences, status competition and cooperation in organisational decisions. His publications address motivation in professional teams, buyer–supplier relationships, leadership and organisational culture. His work on operations strategy examines how coordination within organisations connects strategic objectives with operational decisions.

== Honours and awards ==
Loch was elected a fellow of the Product Innovation and Technology Management College of the Production and Operations Management Society in 2010. In 2011, he received the Research Achievement Award from the Project Management Institute. In 2014, Loch was included in The Case Centre's list of bestselling case authors over its first 40 years. He received the Distinguished Speaker Award from the Technology, Innovation Management and Entrepreneurship Section of INFORMS in 2022 and was elected a member of Academia Europaea in 2025.

His co-authored article "Accelerating Projects by Encouraging Help", published in MIT Sloan Management Review in 2015, received the journal's Richard Beckhard Memorial Prize. His teaching cases have also received awards, including an European Foundation for Management Development case-writing award in technology management for "The Development of Nopane" in 1997 and a European Case Award for "Dragonfly: Development of a UAV" in 2004.

== Books ==
- Loch, C. H.; Van der Heyden, L.; Van Wassenhove, L. N.; Huchzermeier, A.; Escalle, C. (2003). Industrial Excellence: Management Quality in Manufacturing. Springer. ISBN 978-3-540-00254-3.
- Kavadias, S.; Loch, C. H. (2004). Project Selection Under Uncertainty: Dynamically Allocating Resources to Maximize Value. Kluwer Academic Publishers. ISBN 978-1-4020-7703-6.
- Loch, C. H.; De Meyer, A.; Pich, M. T. (2006). Managing the Unknown: A New Approach to Managing High Uncertainty and Risk in Projects. John Wiley & Sons. ISBN 978-0-471-69305-5.
- Loch, C. H.; Kavadias, S., eds. (2007). Handbook of New Product Development Management. Butterworth-Heinemann. ISBN 978-0-7506-8552-8.
- Loch, C. H.; Chick, S.; Huchzermeier, A. (2008). Management Quality and Competitiveness: Lessons from the Industrial Excellence Award. Springer. ISBN 978-3-540-79183-6.
- Loch, C. H.; Chick, S.; Huchzermeier, A. (2008). Managementqualität und Wettbewerbsfähigkeit: Was Manager vom Industrial Excellence Award lernen können (in German). Springer. ISBN 978-3-540-85185-1.
- Jimoh, I. F.; Loch, C. H.; Sengupta, K. (2022). How Megaprojects Are Damaging Nigeria and How to Fix It: A Practical Guide to Mastering Very Large Government Projects. Palgrave Macmillan. ISBN 978-3-030-96473-3.
- Davies, A.; Lenfle, S.; Loch, C. H.; Midler, C., eds. (2023). Handbook on Innovation and Project Management. Edward Elgar Publishing. ISBN 978-1-78990-179-5.
