= Cambridge Centre for Alternative Finance =

Research institute

Cambridge Centre for Alternative Finance Cambridge, UK
- Established: 2015
- Type: Research Centre
- Location: Trumpington Street, Cambridge
- Board of directors: Bryan Zhang, Hunter Sims
- Affiliations: University of Cambridge, Cambridge Judge Business School
- Website: https://www.jbs.cam.ac.uk/faculty-research/centres/alternative-finance/

The Cambridge Centre for Alternative Finance was established in 2015, and is a part of the Cambridge Judge Business School, University of Cambridge. The Centre is a research and education institute focused on researching technology-enabled financial innovation and its interplay with policy, regulation, supervision and infrastructure.

CCAF’s approach includes publishing empirical research, creating digital tools to provide data and insights, and hosting learning opportunities, events, and online capacity building programmes for regulators and industry stakeholders to equip themselves with the necessary knowledge to navigate the evolving financial innovation landscape. The centre includes 4 dedicated research clusters and a Capacity Building and Education Team.

CCAF aims to inform policymakers, regulators, governments and industry stakeholders about alternative financing instruments, channels and systems emerged outside of the traditional financial sector as well as underlying technologies. Since its inception, the centre's main research activity includes benchmarking the growth of alternative finance across different geographies and sectors via annual reports for major regions and countries. Another principal research field focuses on the evolving digital assets sector, including studies on the development of cryptoasset industry and enterprise blockchain as well as related cryptoasset regulation. The centre has also published research on regulatory and supervisory innovation, and regulatory and policy implications of the emergence of FinTech firms.

== History ==
CCAF was founded in January 2015 and aims to address the knowledge gap on technology-enabled financial innovation and related regulatory, supervisory, and infrastructural innovation around the world. The CCAF has worked with over 6,000 FinTech companies, and more than 300 Central Banks and other financial authorities in over 195 jurisdictions.

The centre has produced more than 50 reports on a variety of topics including cryptoassets, supervisory technology, fintech regulation and digital payments.

In 2022, CCAF saw major expansion with the establishment of the Cambridge Suptech Lab and the Cambridge Digital Assets Programme.

== Clusters ==
The Cambridge Centre for Alternative Finance achieves its research goals through four distinct yet integrated research clusters, which work collaboratively to produce knowledge products and services such as reports, digital tools and capacity building and education programmes.

=== The Cambridge SupTech Lab ===
Launched in 2022, Cambridge SupTech lab focuses on technology and innovation in supervisory technology.

Since 2023, SupTech Week is an annual event hosted by the Cambridge SupTech lab where regulators and suptech providers gather to discuss SupTech, participate in educational opportunities, and connect with key stakeholders in suptech.

=== The Cambridge Digital Assets Programme ===
The Cambridge Digital Assets Programme (CDAP) was created in 2022. The programme produces datasets, insights and publicly available digital tools which provide insights into the development and intricacies of digital assets worldwide.

The CDAP focuses on three main research areas, which include Climate Aspects of Digital Assets, Distributed Financial Market Infrastructure (dFMI), and Emergent Money Systems.

=== The Cambridge Regulatory Innovation Hub ===
The Cambridge Regulatory Innovation Hub (RegHub) leverages the Cambridge Centre for Alternative Finance’s expertise to boost regulatory knowledge and capacity for safe, inclusive digital financial services.

The RegHub achieves its aims by conducting empirical studies on regulatory innovation, creating digital tools using research data and findings, and by organising capacity building and educational programs for regulators and policymakers worldwide.

Additionally, the RegHub develops and manages the Regulator Knowledge Exchange (RKE), a digital platform that enables FinTech regulators, policymakers, and supervisors to connect, coordinate, cooperate, and collaborate.

=== The Cambridge Fintech Market Observatory ===
The Cambridge Fintech Market Observatory (CFMO) leverages a decade of research to study alternative financing. It aims to provide robust fintech data for market development and regulation, launching the ‘Future of Global Fintech Research Initiative’ with the World Economic Forum, which collaborates with a research panel of over 220 institutions to research the latest development in the global fintech sector.

Major reports from the CFMO include the Global State of Open Banking and Open Finance Report, an in-depth study of the Open Banking and Open Finance landscape across 95 jurisdictions.

== Capacity Building and Education (CB&E) ==
The Capacity Building and Education (CB&E) team at CCAF offer capacity building and educational programs for regulators and policymakers, support evidence-based policymaking, and provide a platform for global collaboration and knowledge exchange.

The CB&E strives to make a global impact, fostering knowledge sharing both within and outside the organization, promoting collaboration across teams and dissemination of research.

Through CB&E, the CCAF has provided courses to 28 cohorts, educating over 3,000 individuals in the process. Graduates from CB&E programmes include members of more than 300 financial authorities. The programmes include a compulsory capstone project to ensure impact at participant organisations, with a total of over 800 projects.

== Key Members ==
Bryan Zhang is Co-Founder and the Executive Director of the Cambridge Centre for Alternative Finance, and Co-Founder of Financial Innovation for Impact. In 2024, he was appointed to the Board of the Financial Conduct Authority.

Hunter Sims is the Associate Director of Business and Operations at the CCAF and Co-Founder of Financial Innovation for Impact, following a career in corporate banking and time in Rwanda as Head of Credit at a microfinance bank.

Notable persons associated with the centre include Robert Wardrop, a co-founder of the CCAF and a Professor of Practice in Finance and Raghavendra Rau, the first holder of the Sir Evelyn de Rothschild Professorship of Finance at Judge Business School and a former president of the European Finance Association, Bob Wigley, the chairman of UK Finance and former UK business ambassador to the prime minister.

== Key Collaborators and Funders ==
The Cambridge Centre for Alternative Finance receives funding from and collaborates with a host of major organisations including regulatory bodies, universities, charitable foundations, and intergovernmental organisations.

CCAF receives funding from the Gates Foundation and Invesco, the Foreign, Commonwealth and Development Office, along with Switzerland’s State Secretariat for Economic Affairs (SECO), the World Bank and many other public and private sector funders.

CCAF’s ‘Future of Fintech Report’ was written in collaboration with the Word Economic Forum (WEF). The World Bank cited CCAF in a report highlighting global regulatory trends in online alternative finance, emphasising its role in aiding regulators globally to adopt best practices. This report was released as part of a collaborative effort to map the evolving regulatory landscape in over 111 jurisdictions. The Bank for International Settlements (BIS) have also collaborated with the CCAF on several papers and studies.

Institutions like the Financial Stability Board (FSB) and the International Monetary Fund have referenced CCAF's research to inform their analyses of fintech risks and innovations. Furthermore, the centre's publications have been cited in numerous regulatory and policy papers by international organisations and government bodies, some of which include the Organisation for Economic Co-operation and Development, the United Nations Economic and Social Commission for Asia and the Pacific, the International Organization of Securities Commissions, the Association of Southeast Asian Nations, and the UK Parliament.

Several of CCAF’s reports have been jointly published with other universities and research institutes, including University of Chicago Booth School of Business, Tsinghua University, University of California, Berkeley, Zhejiang University, University of Western Ontario, and the University of Agder. In addition, the centre hosts an annual alternative finance conference at the University of Cambridge.

== Bibliography ==
The Cambridge Centre for Alternative Finance has published over 50 reports, with topics including Alternative Finance Benchmarking, Alternative Finance Regulation and Policy, Cryptoasset and Blockchain, and Fintech Market Research.

=== Alternative Financing and Benchmarking Reports ===
- The Rise of Future Finance: UK Alternative Finance Benchmarking Report (2013)
- Understanding Alternative Finance: The UK Alternative Finance Industry Report (2014)
- Moving Mainstream: The European Alternative Finance Benchmarking Report (2015)
- Harnessing Potential: The Asia-Pacific and China Alternative Finance Benchmarking Report (2016)
- Breaking New Ground: The Americas Alternative Finance Benchmarking Report (2016)
- Sustaining Momentum: The Second European Alternative Finance Industry Report (2016)
- Pushing Boundaries: The Third UK Alternative Finance Industry Report (2016)
- Africa and Middle East Alternative Finance Benchmarking Report (2017)
- Hitting Stride: Americas Alternative Finance Industry Report (2017)
- Cultivating Growth: The 2nd Asia Pacific Region Alternative Finance Industry Report (2017)
- Entrenching Innovation: 4th UK Alternative Finance Industry Report (2017)
- Expanding Horizons: The 3rd European Alternative Finance Industry Report (2018)
- Business Access to Alternative Finance: A Deep Dive into Mexico & Chile (2018)
- The 2nd Annual Middle East & Africa Alternative Finance Industry Report (2018)
- 5th UK Alternative Finance Industry Report (2018)
- The 3rd Asia Pacific Region Alternative Finance Report (2018)
- 2018 Global FinTech Hub Report (2018)
- Reaching new heights: The 3rd Americas Alternative Finance Industry Report (2018)
- Early Lessons on Regulatory Innovation to Enable Inclusive FinTech: Innovation Offices, Regulatory Sandboxes and RegTech (2019)
- Shifting Paradigms: The 4th European Alternative Finance Benchmarking Report (2019)
- The ASEAN FinTech Ecosystem Benchmarking Study (2019)
- The Global Alternative Finance Market Benchmarking Report (2020)
- FinTech and big tech credit: a new database (2020)
- Global COVID-19 FinTech Market Rapid Assessment Study (2020)
- The 2nd Global Alternative Finance Market Benchmarking Report (2021)
- The Global COVID-19 Fintech Market Impact and Industry Resilience Study (2022)
- The SME Access to Digital Finance Study: A Deep Dive into the Latin American Fintech Ecosystem (2022)
- The ASEAN Access to Digital Finance Study (2022)

=== Alternative Finance Regulation and Policy ===
- Crowdfunding in East Africa: Regulation and Policy for Market Development (2017)
- Guide to Promoting Financial & Regulatory Innovation (white paper) (2018)
- The Global RegTech Industry Benchmarking Report (2019)
- Regulating Alternative Finance: Results from a Global Regulator Survey (2019)
- Transforming Paradigms – A Global AI in Financial Services Survey (2020)
- Funding the sun: New Paradigms for Financing Off-Grid Solar Companies (2020)
- Fintech Innovation in the Western Balkans: Policy and Regulatory Implications & Potential Interventions (2020)
- 2020 Global COVID-19 FinTech Regulatory Rapid Assessment Study (2020)
- Fintech Regulation in Sub-Saharan Africa (2021)
- Fintech Regulation in the Middle East and North Africa (2022)
- Fintech Regulation in Asia Pacific (2022)
- The 3rd Global Fintech Regulator Survey (2022)
- State of Suptech Report 2022 (2022)
- The Future Development of Open Banking in the UK (2023)
- Considering digital assets for humanitarian cash-based transfers (2023)
- State of SupTech Report 2023 (2024)
- 2nd Global Cryptoasset Regulatory Landscape Study (2024)
- The Global State of Open Banking and Open Finance Report (2024)

=== Cryptoassets and Blockchain ===
- Global Cryptocurrency Benchmarking Study (2017)
- Global Blockchain Benchmarking Study (2017)
- Distributed Ledger Technology Systems: A Conceptual Framework Report (2018)
- 2nd Global Cryptoasset Benchmarking Study (2018)
- Cryptoasset Regulation: Global Cryptoasset Regulatory Landscape Study (2019)
- 2nd Global Enterprise Blockchain Benchmarking Study (2019)
- 3rd Global Cryptoasset Benchmarking Study (2020)
- Legal and Regulatory Considerations for Digital Assets (2020)
- Cryptoasset Ecosystem in Latin America and the Caribbean (2023)

=== Fintech Market Research ===
- The Future of Global Fintech: Towards Resilient and Inclusive Growth (2024)

== Digital Tools ==
The CCAF has released a number of data-driven open-access digital tools to provide insights into topics such as blockchain sustainability, digital assets, and suptech via CCAF.io.

The Cambridge Bitcoin Electricity Consumption Index (CBECI) provides real-time tracking of Bitcoin's energy consumption, sparking debates about the environmental impact of cryptocurrencies. It has been widely cited by major media, including BBC News, and The Guardian, often in discussions about sustainable blockchain technologies and energy policies.

The Cambridge Blockchain Network Sustainability Index (CBNSI), which includes CBECI, underwent major updates in August 2023, and now includes tracking of the environmental impact of Ethereum.

The Cambridge Digital Money Dashboard, launched in 2024, gives the latest data and research on digital money, focusing on stablecoins. Also released in 2024, the Cambridge DeFi Navigator gives data and insights on decentralised finance in a dashboard format.

Other digital tools from the CCAF include the Cambridge Fintech Ecosystem Atlas, Cambridge Alternative Finance Benchmarks, the Global Regulatory Innovation Dashboard, the SupTech Solutions Tracker, and the SupTech Vendor Database.

== The Regulator Knowledge Exchange (RKE) ==
Hosted by CCAF’s RegHub, the Regulator Knowledge Exchange is a global digital community enabling financial regulators to connect, share knowledge, and learn. More than 2,400 RKE members are from over 130 countries, representing more than 300 organisations. 44% of this group are senior management, 45% are women, and 84% of RKE members represent emerging markets and developing economies.

The site includes several networking functions, primarily a forum where members can ask questions and discuss key topics, along with working groups where members can collaborate. The RKE has managed access, ensuring that the RKE network is populated by verified users.

The RKE serves several knowledge-sharing functions, including a library of thousands of relevant resources such as reports, datasets and toolkits. Knowledge Zones hosted by the RKE include Innovation Offices and Regulatory Sandboxes (with the UK Financial Conduct Authority), and Virtual Currency Regulations (with the New York State Department of Financial Services: Approach to Virtual Currency Regulation).

Upcoming Knowledge Zones include an Abu Dhabi Global Market Innovation Hub and a Central Bank Digital Currencies focused Knowledge Zone led by the Bank for International Settlements, Hong Kong Centre. Alongside the library and Knowledge Zones, live events for regulators are posted on the RKE events page.
