= Sucheta =

Sucheta is a given name. People with the name include:

- Sucheta Dalal
- Sucheta Kripalani
- Sucheta Kadethankar
- Sucheta Khanna
- Sucheta Nadkarni
- Sucheta Trivedi
- Sucheta Bhide Chapekar
