= Adam Smith Professor of Corporate Governance =

The Adam Smith Professorship in Corporate Governance is an endowed chair established at the University of Cambridge, assigned to the Cambridge Judge Business School. It is one of many endowed chairs at Cambridge.

From 2001 until 2011 the chair was named the Robert Monks Professorship in Corporate Governance, after Robert A. G. Monks. The professorship was established in 2001 by a gift of US$4,000,000 from the Tyco Corporation of the United States of America and its CEO, Dennis Kozlowski. However, in 2002 after Tyco and Kozlowski became embroiled in a financial scandal based in part on lavish personal spending of corporate funds including the gift to Cambridge, Cambridge was pressured to return the donation. The university ended up keeping the money, but the scandal tainted the chair and made it difficult to find qualified professors to hold it. In 2011, the university renamed the chair after Adam Smith, acting on a request from Robert Monks.

== List of Robert Monks Professors ==
- 2001-2006 Simon Deakin FBA
- 2010- Gishan Dissanaike MPhil, PhD

== List of Adam Smith Professors ==
- 2011- Gishan Dissanaike MPhil, PhD
