= Jaideep Prabhu =

Jaideep Prabhu FBA
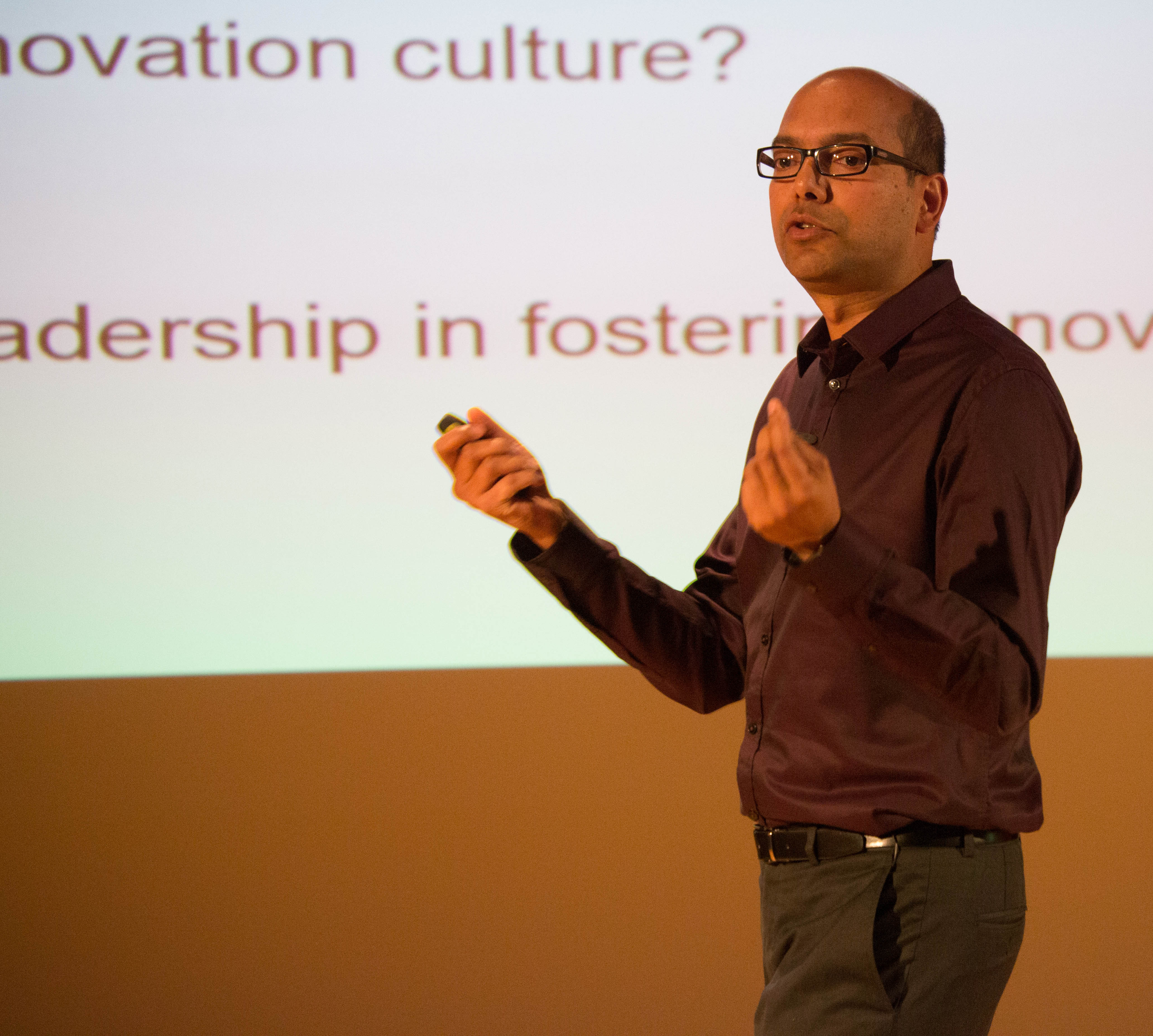
- Prabhu in 2015
- Born: 12 October 1967 (age 58); Bangalore, Karnataka, India

Academic background
- Education: Indian Institute of Technology, Delhi (BTech); University of Southern California (PhD)

Academic work
- Discipline: Business
- Sub-discipline: Marketing
- Institutions: Clare College, Cambridge

Jaideep Prabhu FBA (born 12 October 1967 in Bangalore, Karnataka, India) is the Jawaharlal Nehru professor of business and enterprise at the Judge Business School at the University of Cambridge, England. The Professorship was established by the Government of India with an endowment of £3.2 million. Prabhu is also the director of the Centre for India & Global Business (CIGB). He is the co-author of Jugaad Innovation: Think Frugal, Be Flexible, Generate Breakthrough Growth, described by The Economist as "the most comprehensive book" on the subject of frugal innovation.

== Education and teaching ==
Prabhu holds a Bachelor of Technology degree from the Indian Institute of Technology, Delhi and a PhD from the University of Southern California. He was Visiting Assistant Professor at the University of California from 1995 to 1996, then Assistant Professor and Fellow at the Centre for Economic Research, Tilburg University, from 1996 to 1999. He was Director of Studies at Fitzwilliam College and Clare College from 1999 to 2004 and University Lecturer, then University Senior Lecturer in Marketing at the then Judge Institute of Management, University of Cambridge from 2002 to 2004. He was Innovation Fellow of the Advanced Institute of Management (AIM) from 2007 to 2009. He was Professor of Marketing, Tanaka Business School, Imperial College London from 2004, becoming Director of Research 2007–2008. He has been a Fellow of Clare College since 2009. His research interest in marketing strategy is specifically related to innovation, organizational learning and competitive interaction. He teaches marketing strategy, marketing management, international marketing, brand management and high-technology marketing.

== Editorial experience ==
Prabhu is a member of the editorial boards of the Journal of Marketing and the Journal of Management Studies, and is a member of the senior advisory board of the European Journal of Marketing.

== Published papers ==
- "Radical Innovation in Firms Across Nations: The Pre-Eminence of Corporate Culture," with Gerard Tellis and Rajesh Chandy, Journal of Marketing, 73(1), January 2009, 3–23.
- "The Fruits of Legitimacy: Why Some New Ventures Gain More From Innovation Than Others," with Raghunath Rao and Rajesh Chandy, Journal of Marketing, 72(4), October 2008, 58–75.
- "Managing the Future: CEO Attention and Innovation Outcomes," with Manjit Yadav and Rajesh Chandy, Journal of Marketing, 71(3), October 2007, 84–101.
- "Why Some Acquisitions Do Better than Others: Product Capital as a Driver of Long-term Stock Returns" with Alina Sorescu and Rajesh Chandy, Journal of Marketing Research, 44(1), February 2007, 57–72.
- "From Invention to Innovation: Conversion Ability in Product Development," with Rajesh Chandy, Brigitte Hopstaken and Om Narasimhan, Journal of Marketing Research, 43(3), August 2006, 494–508.
- "The Effect of Price Disclosure on Dynamic Shopping Decisions," with Benedict G.C. Dellaert and Vladislav Golunov, Marketing Letters, 16(1), June 2005, 37–52.
- "Acquisition and Innovation in High-Tech Firms: Poison Pill, Placebo, or Tonic?" with Rajesh Chandy and Mark Ellis, Journal of Marketing, 69(1), January 2005, 114–130.
- "The Influence of Business Strategy on New Product Activity: The Role of Market Orientation," with Ruud Frambach and Theo Verhallen, International Journal of Research in Marketing, 20(4), December 2003, 377–397.
- "Sources and Financial Consequences of Radical Innovation: Insights from Pharmaceuticals," with Alina Sorescu and Rajesh Chandy, Journal of Marketing, 67(4), October 2003, 82–102.
- "On the Relative Importance of Customer Satisfaction and Trust as Determinants of Customer Retention and Positive Word of Mouth," with Chatura Ranaweera, Journal of Targeting, Measurement and Analysis for Marketing, 12(1), September 2003, 82–90.
- "What Will the Future Bring? Dominance, Technology Expectations, and Radical Product Innovation," with Rajesh Chandy and Kersi Antia, Journal of Marketing, 67(3), July 2003, 1–19. Lead article.
- "Signaling Strategies in Competitive Interaction: Building Reputations and Hiding the Truth," with David Stewart, Journal of Marketing Research, 38 (1), February 2001, 62–73.

== Selected awards and honours ==
- Runner-up for the Harold H. Maynard Award, 2009.
- IBM faculty award for research into the impact of new technology on Indian retail, 2009.
- Winner, AMA TechSIG Award for the Best Article on Technology or Innovation, 2008.
- Advanced Institute of Management (AIM) Research, Innovation Fellowship, 2007–2009.
- Runner-up, AMA TechSIG Award for the Best Article on Technology or Innovation, 2007.
- Winner, AMA TechSIG Award for the Best Article on Technology or Innovation, 2004.
- Highly Commended Paper Award from the American Marketing Association-Service Special Interest Group, Reims, France, 2003.
- Frugal Innovation: How to Do More with Less" was published in February 2015 and won the Chartered Management Institute's Management Book of the Year Award 2016
- Elected Fellow of the British Academy 2023

== Consultancy ==
Professor Prabhu has consulted with or taught executives from ABN Amro, Bertelsmann AG, Barclays Bank, British Telecom, BP, the UK's Department of Trade and Industry (DTI), EDS, Egg Banking, GE, IBM, ING Group, Laird plc, NHS, Nokia, Oce Copiers, Philips, Roche, Shell, Vodafone, Which? and Xerox among other organisations in Colombia, Finland, Germany, Netherlands, Portugal, Switzerland, UK and US.
