= Geoff Meeks =

British accounting academic

Geoffrey (Geoff) Meeks (born 1949) is a British accounting scholar and Professor of Financial Accounting at the University of Cambridge, known for his work on M&A and on "Accounting standards and the economics of standards."

== Biography ==
Meeks obtained his BA in Economics from the University of Cambridge in 1971 and a Ph.D. in Accounting and Economics from the University of Edinburgh in 1975

Meeks started his career as accountant trainee in Price Waterhouse in 1971. From 1972 to 1975 he was Research Associate at the University of Edinburgh, Department of Accounting and Business Method. In 1975 he moved to the University of Cambridge, where he started as Postdoctoral Research Fellow, and became Research Officer at the Department of Applied Economics. At Cambridge he was Assistant Director of Research and Director of Graduate Studies of the Economics Faculty from 1975 to 1990. In 1990 he was appointed University Lecturer in Accounting, and became Senior Lecturer, and since 2003 Professor of Financial Accounting.

Meeks was Acting Dean of the University's Cambridge Judge Business School from 2010 to 2011. He has held visiting positions at Harvard Business School, INSEAD, and London School of Economics. He was a member of the Academic Panel of the Accounting Standards Board.

== Work ==
Meeks accounting research is at the intersection of economics and accounting. He has been among the first to:

- construct large electronic databases of company financial statements, and deploy them to answer questions from industrial and financial economics
- marry macroeconomic models with models of company accounts
- exploit economic cost-benefit analysis to assess the efficient level of accounting regulation.
- analyse and document the role of accounting manipulation in distorting the M&A market

Recurrent themes have included dysfunctional takeover and inefficient insolvency. Early work reported the disappointing financial results of the average takeover; then sought explanations of these results in systems of directors' pay, and in directors' misinforming shareholders. On insolvency, he has analysed the role of exogenous macroeconomic shocks and of accounting valuation conventions in distorting the process of company failure.

Meeks has been heavily involved in the adoption by Cambridge of taught Masters courses; and has been founding director or co-founder of the Cambridge MPhil in Economics, MPhil in Finance, and Master of Finance programmes.

== Books, a selection ==
- G Meeks, Disappointing Marriage: A Study of the Gains from Merger, Cambridge University Press, 1977, ISBN 0 521 21691 5 (hard covers) 29234 4 (paperback)
- A W Goudie and G Meeks, Company Finance and Performance, Cambridge University, Dept. of Applied Economics, 1986, ISBN 0 906251 08 7, Pp. 627; version digitised by the Bank of England, 2019: https://s3.amazonaws.com/escoe-website/wp-content/uploads/2019/11/23144452
- Simpson, D., Meeks, G., Klumpes, P., & Andrews, P. (2000). Some cost-benefit issues in financial regulation. London: Financial Services Authority.
- A Amel-Zadeh and G Meeks, eds., Accounting for M&A: Uses and Abuses of Accounting in Monitoring and Promoting Merger, Routledge, 2020 (author/co-author of 11 chapters)
- Geoff Meeks and J. Gay Meeks, The Merger Mystery: Why Spend Ever More on Mergers When so Many Fail? Open Book Publishers, 2022 (digital version: https://www.openbookpublishers.com/books/10.11647/obp.0309 )

== Articles, a selection ==
- Meeks, G., (1974) Profit illusion, Oxford Bulletin of Economics and Statistics, 1974, 36: 267-86
- Meeks, G. and Whittington, G. (1975) Giant companies in the United Kingdom, 1948–69, Economic Journal, 1975, 85: 824-43
- Meeks, G. and Whittington, G, (1975) Directors’ pay, growth and profitability, Journal of Industrial Economics, 1975, 24: 1-14
- Meeks, G. and Meeks, J.G., (1981) Profitability measures as indicators of post-merger efficiency, Journal of Industrial Economics, 1981, 29: 335-44
- Goudie, A. and Meeks, G., (1991) The exchange rate and company failure in a macro-micro model of the UK company sector, Economic Journal, 1991, 101: 444-57
- Gwilliam, D., Macve, R. and G Meeks, G., (2005) The costs and benefits of accounting regulation: a case study of Lloyd's of London, Accounting and Business Research, 2005, 35: 129-46, DOI: 10.1080/00014788.2005.9729669
- Botsari, Antonia, and Geoff Meeks. "Do acquirers manage earnings prior to a share for share bid?." Journal of Business Finance & Accounting 35.5‐6 (2008): 633-670.
- Meeks, G. and Meeks, J.G., (2009) Self-fulfilling prophecies of failure: the endogenous balance sheets of distressed companies, Abacus, 2009, 45:22-43 doi.org/10.1111/j.1467-6281.2009.00276.x
- Meeks, Geoff, and GM Peter Swann. "Accounting standards and the economics of standards." Accounting and Business Research 39.3 (2009): 191-210.
- Amel-Zadeh, A. and Meeks, G., (2013) Bank failure, mark to market and the financial crisis, Abacus, 2013, 49 (3), 308-339 (2013 https://doi.org/10.1111/abac.12011
- Meeks, G. and Meeks, J.G., (2014) Why are banks paying so little UK Corporation Tax?, Fiscal Studies, 2014, 35(4): 511-533, doi.org/10.1111/j.1475-5890.2014.12040.x
- Botsari, A. and Meeks, G., (2018) Acquirers’ earnings management ahead of stock-for-stock bids in “hot” and “cold” markets, Journal of Accounting and Public Policy, 2018, 37: 355-375, doi.org/10.1016/j.jaccpubpol.2018.09.007
- Amel-Zadeh, A. and G. Meeks, G. (2019) Bidder earnings forecasts in mergers and acquisitions, Journal of Corporate Finance, 58: 373-392, doi.org/10.1016/j.jcorpfin.2019.06.002
- Dissanaike, G., Jayasekera, R. and Meeks, G. (2022), Why do unsuccessful companies survive? A case study of US airlines and aircraft leasing, 2000-2008 Business History Review 96(3), 615-642, doi:10.1017/S0007680521000465
- Meeks, G. and Whittington, G. (2023), Death on the Stock Exchange: the fate of the 1948 population of quoted companies, 1948-2018, Business History, DOI: 10.1080/00076791.2021.1893696
