= Arnoud De Meyer =

Arnoud De Meyer PBM
- Born: Belgium
- Occupation: Academic
- Awards: Public Service Medal (Gold); Commander, Order of Leopold

Academic background
- Education: PhD
- Alma mater: University of Cambridge; University of Ghent

Academic work
- Discipline: Business
- Sub-discipline: Management
- Institutions: Singapore Management University; University of Cambridge; INSEAD
- Main interests: manufacturing strategy; R&D management; international management in Asia

Arnoud De Meyer PBM is a Belgian business academic at the Lee Kong Chian School of Business of Singapore Management University (SMU). He was previously President of SMU, Director of the Judge Business School of the University of Cambridge, and founding Dean of INSEAD's Asia Campus in Singapore.

== Career ==
An electrical engineer by training, De Meyer obtained a graduate degree in business administration from the University of Ghent and worked as an instrumentation engineer for a few years before returning to the university to complete a PhD in management. After that, he started on the path of being a business academic. He was associated for 23 years with INSEAD as a professor and as Dean for INSEAD's MBA programme, Executive Education and the Euro Asia Centre. He was also the founding Dean of INSEAD's Asia Campus in Singapore and wrote extensively with Frank-Jürgen Richter. After that, he was appointed Director of the Judge Business School at the University of Cambridge from 2006 to 2010. He was also Professor of Management Studies and Fellow of Jesus College at Cambridge. De Meyer resigned as the Director of the Judge Business School in August 2010 to assume the position of the President of Singapore Management University (SMU) on 1 September 2010. He stepped down as President of SMU at the start of 2019 and was succeeded by Lily Kong. He remains a faculty member at SMU's Lee Kong Chian School of Business.

Academic offices
| Preceded by Howard Hunter | President of Singapore Management University; 2010–2019 | Succeeded by Lily Kong |
