= Maggie O'Carroll =

Social entrepreneur

- Born: Maggie O'Carroll
- Occupation(s): Social entrepreneur, professor
- Organisation: The Women’s Organisation

Maggie O'Carroll is the CEO of The Women's Organisation, a visiting professor at Scotland's University of Strathclyde, and a leader in the social enterprise sector.

== Career ==
O'Carroll is a graduate of the Judge Business School at the University of Cambridge. She co-founded The Women's Organisation, initially named Train 2000, in 1996. Her organization is UK's largest female enterprise agency and has supported over 70,000 enterprising women and helped created over 4,000 businesses.

In 2017, she was recognized as one of the Spotlight 10 by Women in Social Enterprise 100 (WISE100), an initiative by NatWest SE100 Index and Pioneers Post. As well as University of Strathclyde, she has also given invited lectures at the University of Liverpool and Liverpool John Moores University.
