= Sir Evelyn de Rothschild Professor of Finance =

Established chair at the University of Cambridge

The Sir Evelyn de Rothschild Professorship of Finance is an established chair at the University of Cambridge. The chair is currently assigned to Judge Business School which is the Faculty of Business and Management at Cambridge University. The chair was established in 2007, following a benefaction of £1.85m from the Eranda Foundation in honour of Sir Evelyn de Rothschild, former chairman of N M Rothschild & Sons, and student of economics at Cambridge.

== List of Rothschild Professors ==
- 2010- Raghavendra Rau
