= Singapore Management University =

Autonomous university in Singapore founded in 2000

- Universiti Pengurusan Singapura (Malay) 新加坡管理大學 (Chinese) சிங்கப்பூர் நிர்வாக பல்கலைக்கழகம் (Tamil)
- Type: Autonomous university
- Established: 29 July 2000; 26 years ago
- Endowment: S$1.543 billion (US$1.20 billion)
- Chancellor: Lim Chee Onn
- President: Lily Kong
- Provost: Alan Chan
- Faculty: 407
- Undergraduates: 10,294
- Postgraduates: 3,766
- Location: 81 Victoria St, Bras Basah, Singapore; 1°17′48″N 103°50′59″E
- Campus: Urban; City campus
- Colours: Blue; Gold
- Website: smu.edu.sg

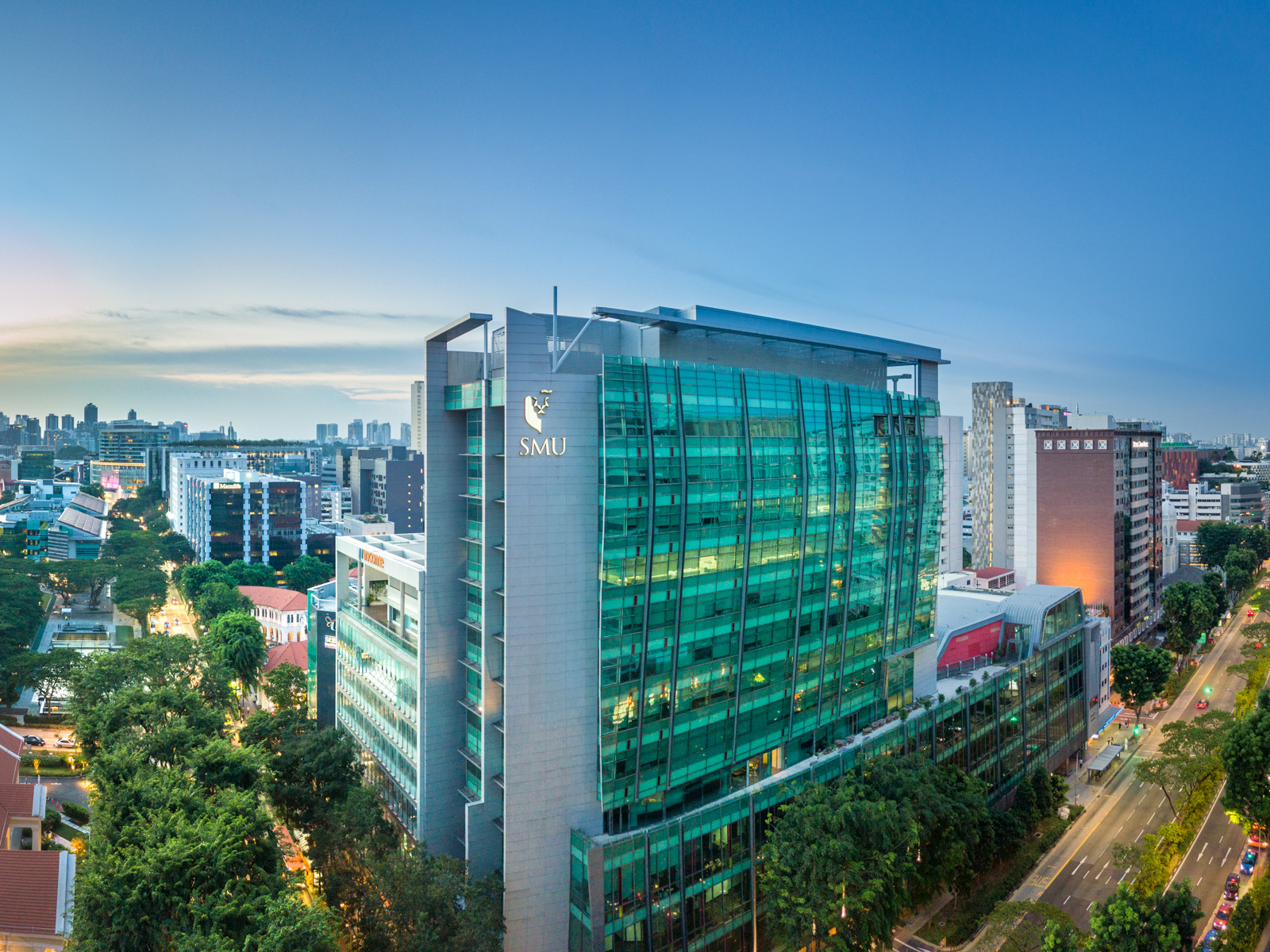
SMU Administration Building

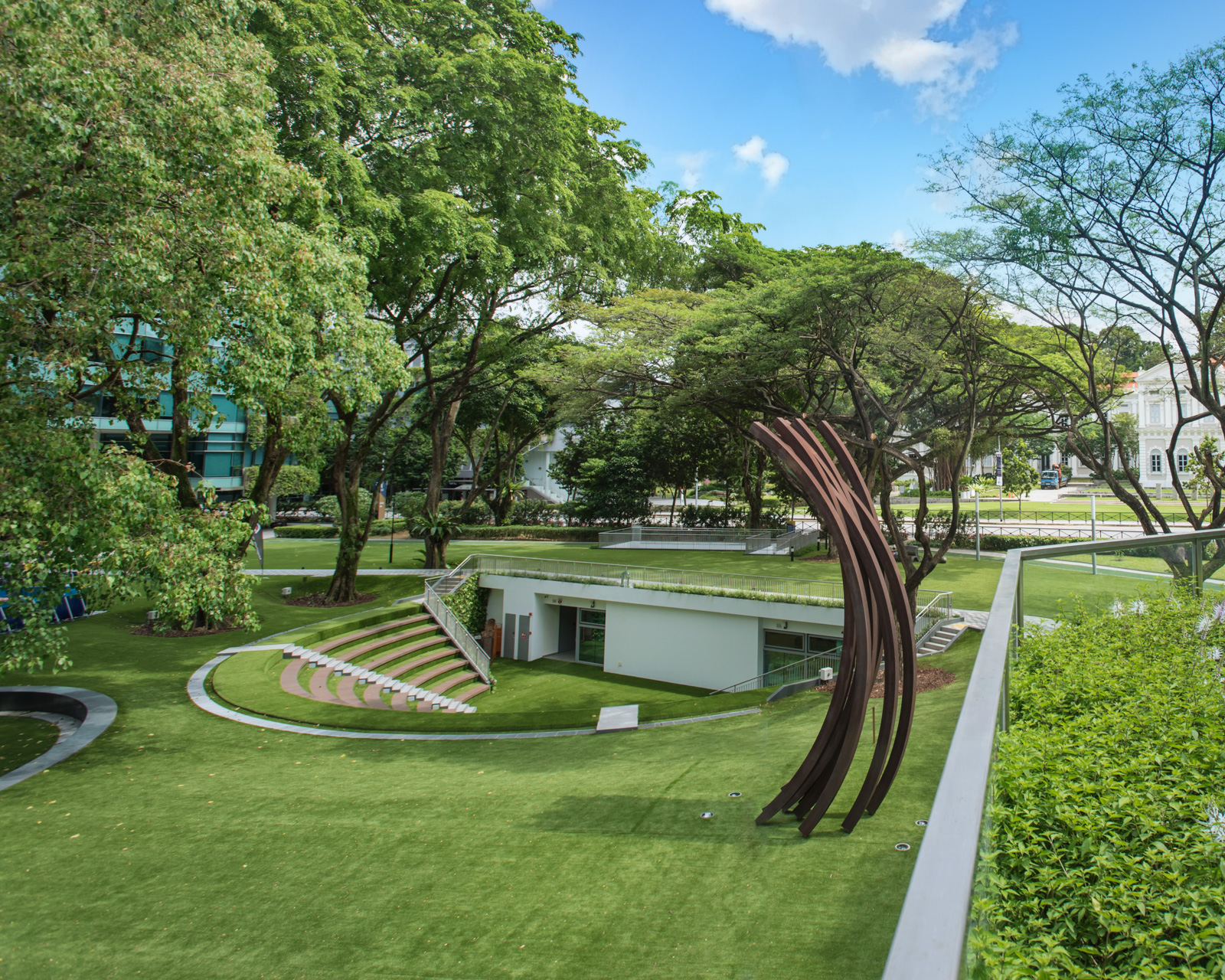
SMU Campus Green with the sculpture "97.5° Arc x 8" by artist Bernar Venet

Singapore Management University (SMU) is a publicly-funded autonomous university. It was established in 2000, and is located in the Bras Basah-Bugis District. During its planning phase, SMU adopted an American-style business school model and in 1999 signed a collaboration agreement with the Wharton School of the University of Pennsylvania to guide curriculum and institutional design for the new university. The university is triple accredited by AACSB, EQUIS and AMBA. In 2026, SMU was identified as the most improved university globally in the QS World University Rankings by Subject, with more than ten subjects ranked.

SMU enrols about 10,000 undergraduate and postgraduate students, offering undergraduate and graduate degree programmes in accountancy, business administration, business analytics, economics, financial services, information systems, software engineering, law, and the social sciences.

The university is organised into eight schools: School of Accountancy, Lee Kong Chian School of Business, School of Economics, School of Computing and Information Systems, Yong Pung How School of Law, School of Social Sciences, College of Integrative Studies and the College of Graduate Research Studies.

== History ==
=== Founding ===
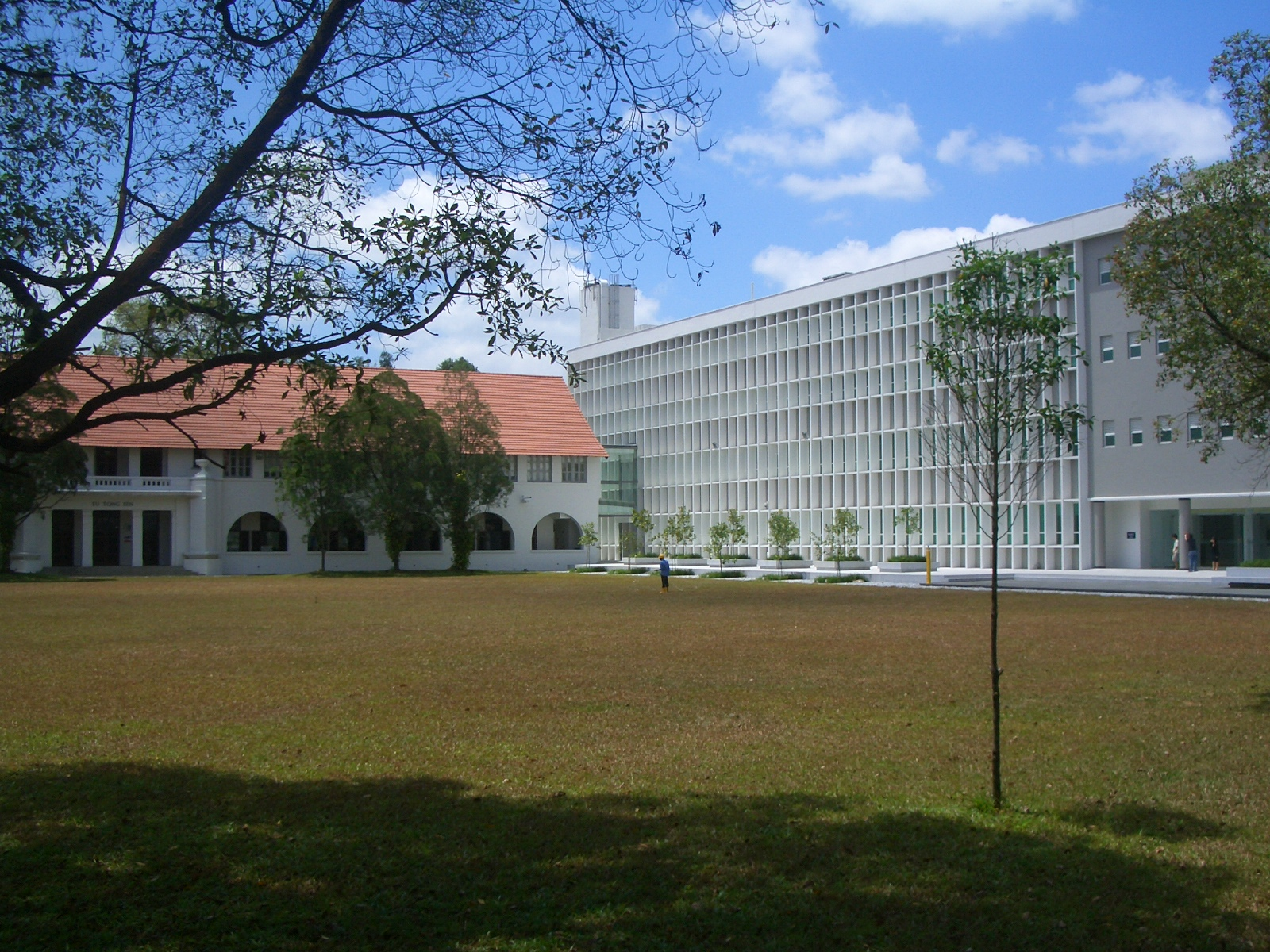
The former Raffles College, the site of SMU's first campus

In 1997, the Government of Singapore began considering setting up a third university in Singapore. Ho Kwon Ping, a Singaporean business entrepreneur, was appointed to chair the task-force which determined that the new institution would follow the American university system featuring a more flexible broad-based education. Following a review of undergraduate business schools to serve as a model for SMU, the Wharton School of the University of Pennsylvania emerged as the best candidate. The Wharton-SMU agreement was signed in February 1999 followed in June by the Wharton-SMU Research Center collaboration.

In July 1999, Janice Bellace, then Deputy Dean of the Wharton School of the University of Pennsylvania, commenced a two-year term as SMU's first president alongside founding provost, Tan Chin Tiong.

=== Early years and campus development ===
In 2000, SMU admitted its first batch of students and began operations at the former Raffles College (now the National University of Singapore's Bukit Timah campus) on Evans Road near Hwa Chong Institution. The historic campus, first opened in 1929, had previously housed several educational institutions and served as the university's temporary home during its formative years. In 2001, SMU upgraded and occupied the main campus facilities, balancing the need to refit and refurbish it with facilities while preserving the heritage of colonial architecture.

Between 2000 and 2005, SMU established its first four schools, its library and three centres of excellence. It also saw the graduation of its first batch of students. During this period, Ronald Frank served as SMU's second president from 2001 to 2004, before being succeeded by Howard Hunter.

In 2005, SMU moved from its Bukit Timah campus to its current campus in the Bugis-Bras Basah district. The campus was developed as Singapore's first purpose-built city campus, with plans calling for the university to be integrated into the surrounding civic, cultural and business environment.

=== Expansion and development ===
SMU has expanded its academic offerings in the following years. In 2007, it established its School of Law, later renamed as the Yong Pung How School of Law in 2021. In 2026, the School of Law was ranked 56th globally by the QS World University Rankings, improving from the 101-150 band in previous years. The former School of Economics and Social Sciences was subsequently reorganised into two separate schools: the School of Economics and the School of Social Sciences.

Additional schools were introduced over time, including the School of Information Systems, the School of Computing and Information Systems, and the College of Integrative Studies, reflecting the university's growing interdisciplinary focus and expansion into new fields of study.

=== Leadership and governance ===
SMU is governed by a Board of Trustees and led by its president, who serves as the university's chief executive officer. Ho Kwon Ping served as the founding chairman of the Board. He was succeeded by Piyush Gupta in 2024.

Dr Richard Hu served as the university's founding chancellor. He was succeeded by Yong Pung How in 2010, followed by J. Y. Pillay in 2015 and Lim Chee Onn in 2019.

The university's presidents have been Janice Bellace (1999–2001), Ronald Frank (2001–2004), Howard Hunter (2004–2010), Arnoud De Meyer (2010–2018) and Lily Kong (2019–present). Kong became SMU's fifth president in January 2019 and is the first Singaporean female academic to hold the position.

== Academics ==
SMU follows a course credit system similar to that used in most American universities. Each individual course within the university is assigned a certain credit weightage and students are usually required to take a specified number of units to fulfill requirements for graduation. Courses are typically conducted as small group seminars of under 50 students. Undergraduate students may be enrolled in second majors as well as double degrees.

=== Admissions ===
SMU admits students from a list of pre-university or high school qualifications that includes the Singapore-Cambridge GCE Advanced Level, diplomas from the five polytechnics or two arts institutions and International Baccalaureate diploma once a year. For entry to graduate or master programmes, SMU requires GMAT and TOEFL or IELTS for most of the majors. Some majors also require submission of essays, recommendation letters, and a minimum work experience requirement.

=== Curriculum ===
SMU’s undergraduate curriculum includes a set of core modules taken by all students, covering areas such as ethics and modes of thinking. The university also offers prerequisite modules for certain degree requirements, depending on programme structure. SMU currently offers about 1,000 courses across its various schools.

The university requires undergraduates to complete an internship as part of their graduation requirements, providing students with work-based experience in their chosen fields. Its industry-oriented curriculum and mandatory internship requirement contribute to early workplace exposure. For the 2024 cohort, nearly 80 per cent of students completed more than one internship, with an average of 2.8 internships per student. Survey findings further indicated that 31.6 per cent of graduates who secured full-time employment obtained positions at organisations where they had previously interned.

Since 2018, SMU has required all undergraduates to complete an overseas experience as part of their graduation requirements. Eligible activities include exchange programmes, internships, study missions or community service projects. The university provides financial assistance to support students in fulfilling this requirement, including students from lower-income households.

== Schools ==
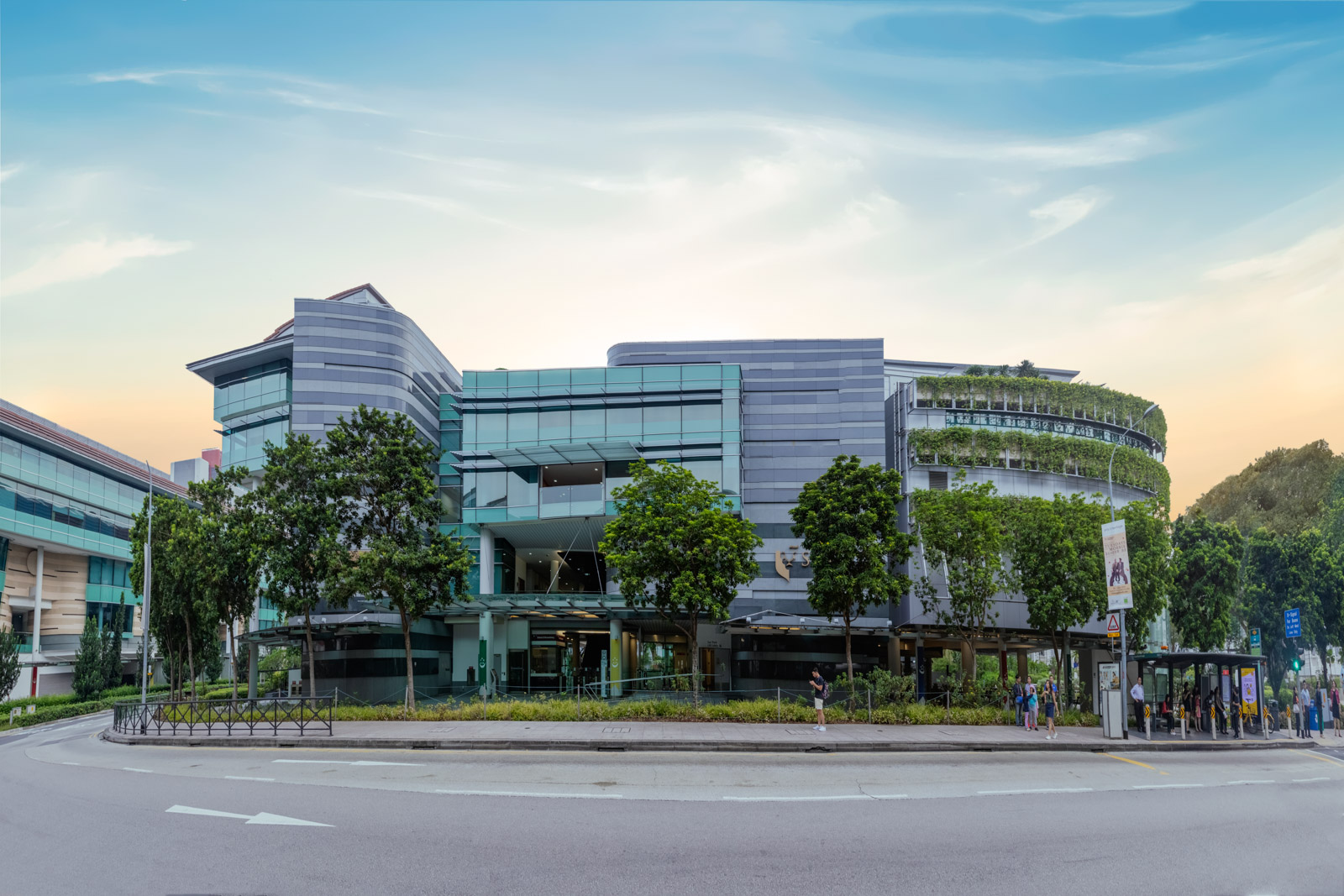
School of Accountancy

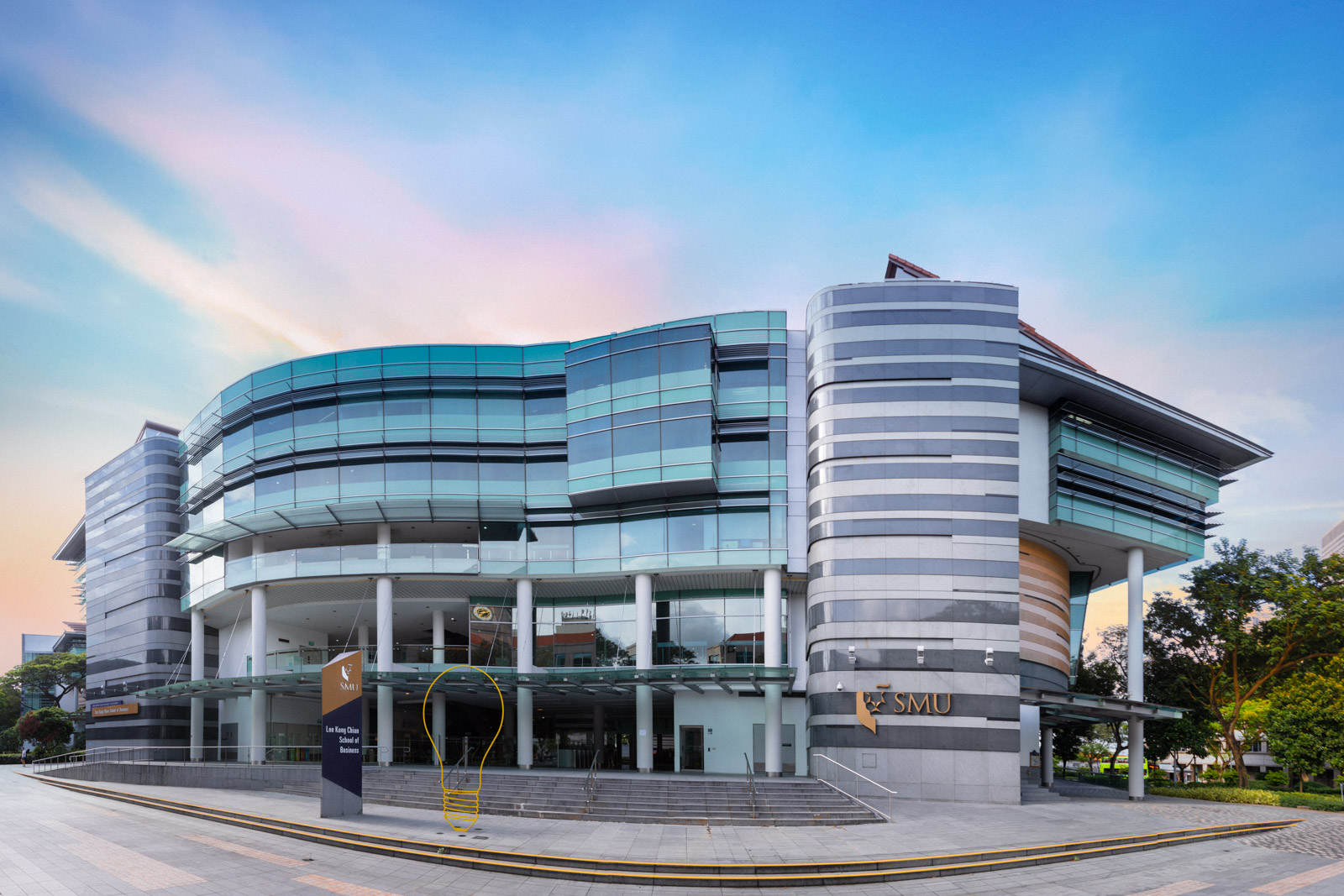
Lee Kong Chian School of Business

=== School of Accountancy ===
The School of Accountancy was launched in 2001 with the Bachelor of Accountancy (BAcc) undergraduate degree as its sole offering. In 2005, the school launched the Master of Professional Accounting (MPA) programme for professionals without undergraduate accounting qualifications.

Both the SMU MPA and BAcc are accredited with the Institute of Singapore Chartered Accountants, Chartered Accountant Singapore, the Accounting and Corporate Regulatory Authority (ACRA), CPA Australia, the Institute of Chartered Accountants Australia (ICAA) and the Institute of Chartered Accountants in England and Wales (ICAEW).

=== Lee Kong Chian School of Business ===
The Lee Kong Chian School of Business was SMU's first school, opening its doors to its pioneer batch of Bachelor of Business Management (BBM) students in August 2000. The school was named after the philanthropist Lee Kong Chian. In addition to its undergraduate offerings, the school offers masters degrees and PhDs.

=== School of Economics ===
The School of Economics (SOE) was established in July 2002 as part of the then School of Economics and Social Sciences (SESS). The SOE has a total of 51 full-time faculty with extensive experience from around the world. As of now, the SOE offers the Bachelor of Science (Economics) as well as Master of Science programmes in Economics and Applied Economics. In 2007, the school also introduced a PhD in Economics programme.

=== School of Computing and Information Systems ===
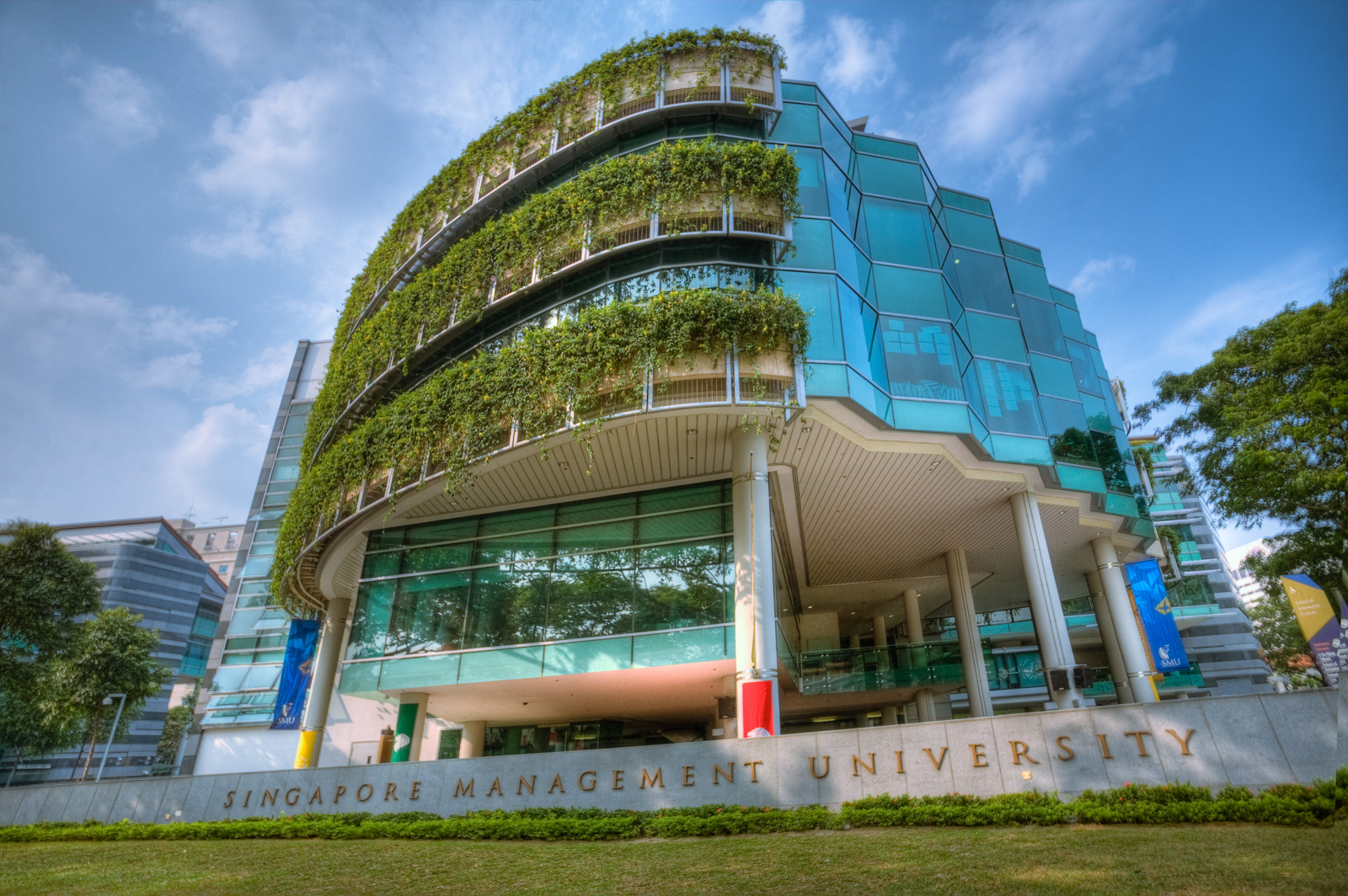
School of Computing and Information Systems

The School of Computing and Information Systems (SCIS) was first formed as the School of Information Systems (SIS) with the aid of Carnegie Mellon University (CMU).

In 2021, the school was rebranded as the School of Computing and Information Systems to reflect the larger focus on computing and software development in its offerings. Currently, the school offers four undergraduate degrees: Information Systems, Computer Science, Computing & Law, and Software Engineering.

In addition to its bachelor's degrees, SCIS also offers the Master of Science in Computer Science, Master of Philosophy in Information Systems, Master of IT in Business, the PhD in Information Systems/Computer Science and Doctor of Engineering (D.Eng.) programmes.

=== Yong Pung How School of Law ===
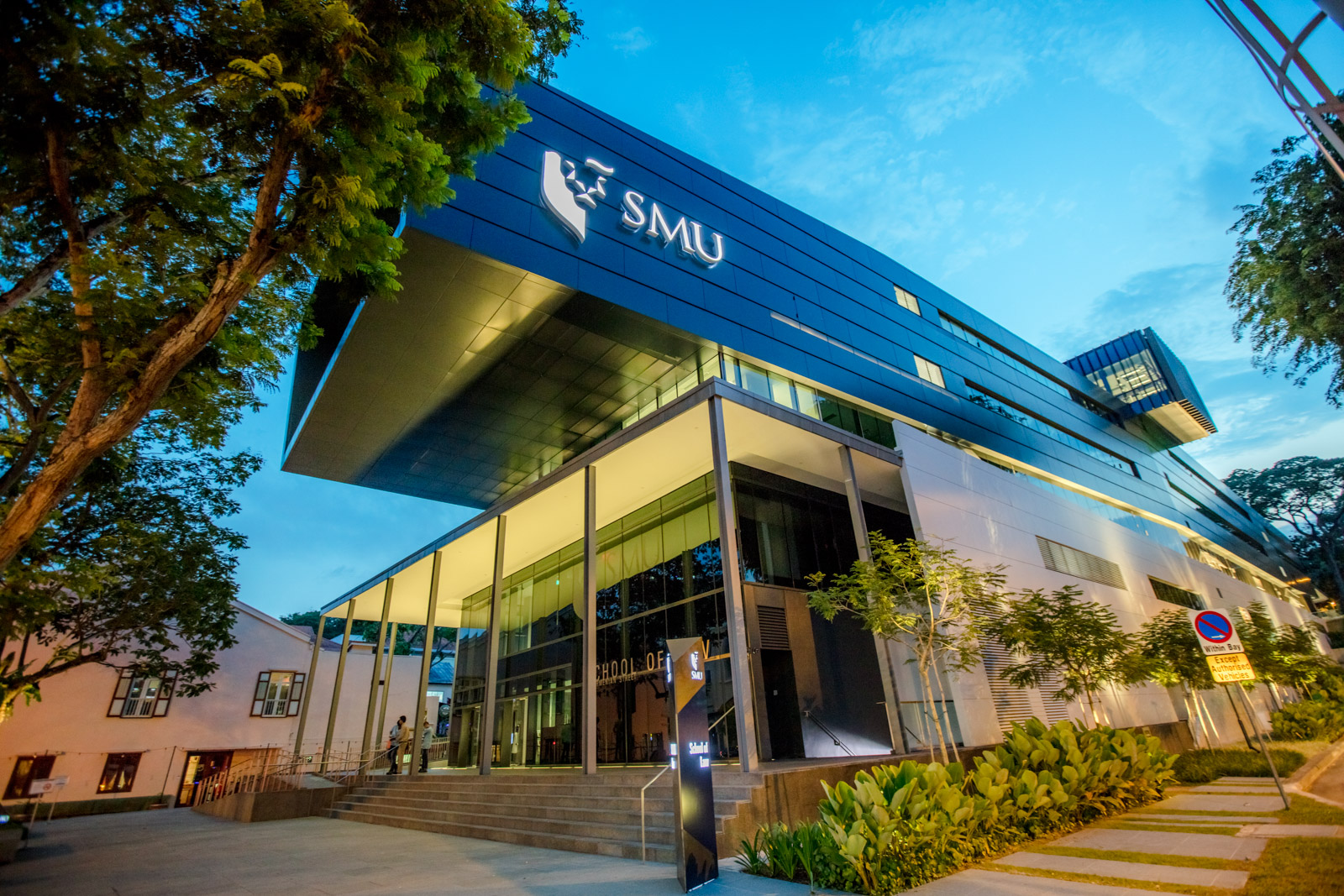
School of Law

Originally named School of Law, the Yong Pung How School of Law (SOL) is SMU's smallest school with an annual intake of around 180 students. Before the establishment of the Yong Pung How School of Law, SMU offered an initial law programme that formed the basis for the later school. The programme was led by Andrew Phang, who served in the founding academic leadership of SMU’s early legal education initiatives. The School of Law was subsequently established as a full school within SMU as part of the university’s expansion of its legal education offerings. The establishment of the SOL was announced in August 2007. In 2022, Professor Lee Pey Woan was appointed Dean of the School of Law, succeeding Professor Goh Yihan.

On 11 April 2021, SMU renamed the school to include former chief justice Yong Pung How's name as a recognition for his founding contributions to the university.

The SOL offers the Bachelor of Laws (LLB) undergraduate programme, as well as a postgraduate Juris Doctor (JD) programme. The school also offers a Master of Laws (LLM) programme, with the option of a dual LLM with Queen Mary University of London.

=== School of Social Sciences ===
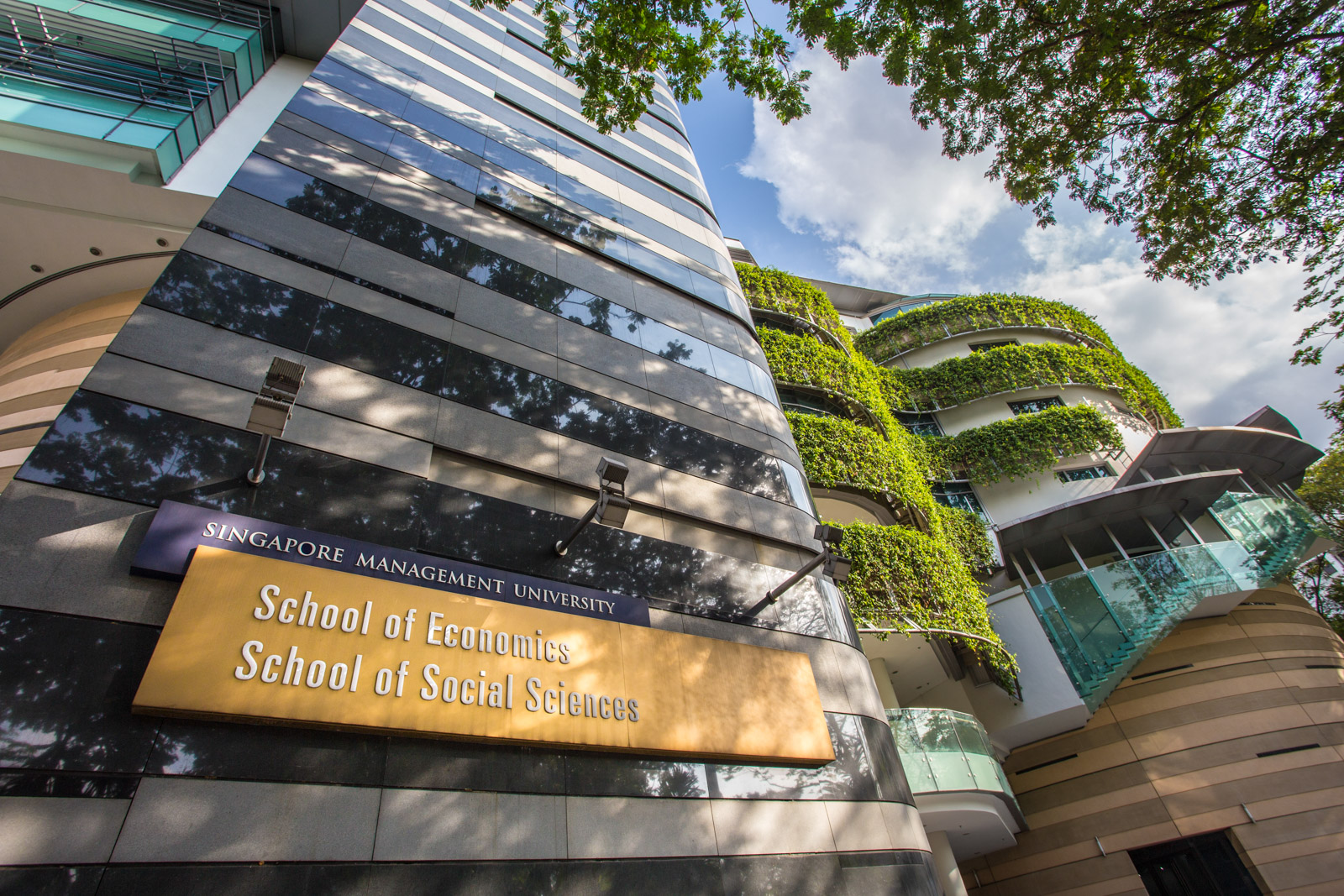
School of Economics and School of Social Sciences

The School of Social Sciences (SOSS) was established in July 2002 as part of the then School of Economics and Social Sciences (SESS). Through a restructuring exercise in 2007, the School of Economics and School of Social Sciences were separated to form independent schools within SMU. The SOSS's primary offering is the Bachelor of Social Science, a multi-disciplinary undergraduate programme. Within this programme, three main majors are offered, namely political science, psychology and sociology. In addition, the SOSS offers a PhD in Psychology.

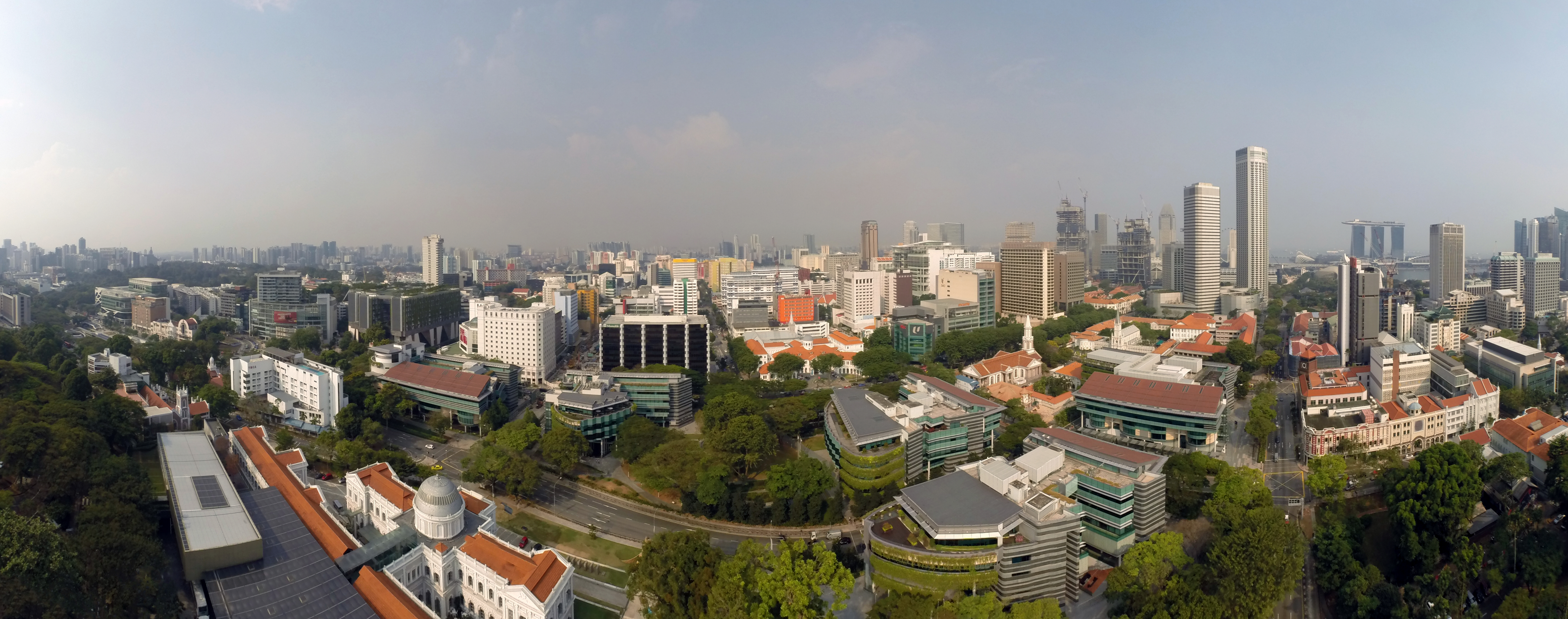
A 2014 aerial panorama of the university (from left to right): School of Economics / School of Social Sciences, School of Information Systems, Li Ka Shing Library, School of Accountancy / School of Law, and Lee Kong Chian School of Business.

=== College of Integrative Studies ===
SMU was the first university in Singapore to offer an Individualised Major as part of its undergraduate curriculum. Through the College of Integrative Studies (CIS), students may design a customised major that integrates courses from multiple disciplines. Students spend their first year exploring different fields of study before declaring their major in the second year. During the first year, CIS students also take core and prerequisite modules, allowing them to remain aligned with peers in other SMU schools should they decide to transfer.

CIS welcomed its first cohort of students in academic year 2023–24.

=== College of Graduate Research Studies ===
The College of Graduate Research Studies (CGRS) was established in 2022 as SMU's eighth school. The college oversees interdisciplinary graduate research education and coordinates doctoral and research master's programmes that span multiple academic disciplines.

Its first programme was the PhD in Law, Commerce and Technology, an interdisciplinary doctoral programme jointly supported by the university's law, business and computing faculties.

In collaboration with the College of Integrative Studies, CGRS subsequently developed interdisciplinary Master's and PhD programmes in Asian Urbanisms, with the first intake commencing in 2023.

The college also administers university-wide research training and professional development programmes, including the Graduate Research Interdisciplinary Topics (GRIT) and Graduate Research Professional Development (GRPD) programmes.

== Professional education ==
=== SMU Academy ===
SMU Academy offers programmes for working professionals, to provide continuous lifelong education through diplomas and certificate programs. This includes a combination of practical industry knowledge and general management skills.

=== SMU Executive Development ===
In addition to its traditional academic programmes, the university also runs executive education and development programmes for leaders at four stages of their career: emerging leaders, general managers, senior executives and corporate directors. These courses include Executive Skills for board members in Challenging Times; SNEF-SMU CEO Seminars: The Art & Science of Productivity Leadership; and Johnson & Johnson-SMU Hospital Management.

SMU Executive Development offers programmes aimed at leaders at four stages of their careers, including emerging leaders, general managers, senior executives and corporate directors.

== Institutes and centres ==
=== Institute of Innovation and Entrepreneurship ===
The Institute of Innovation and Entrepreneurship was established in 2009 and provides research, innovation and entrepreneurship training for the students of the university. In the same year, Business Innovations Generator, a start-up incubation programme was implemented. In 2017, the institute launched Protégé Ventures, a student-run venture fund and training program. The first in Southeast Asia, it gives undergraduate and postgraduate students from Singapore-based universities a practical, real-life venture capital experience in sourcing, analysing and investing in technology-enabled Asean startups with at least one student founder.

The institute organises a major startup business competition called the Lee Kuan Yew Global Business Plan Competition, which receives entries from a large number of international universities. In 2020, the competition received submissions from over 650 universities.

The tenth edition of the LKYGBPC launched the VC Office Hours, offering one-on-one consultations for founders by more than 30 senior partners from leading venture capital firms. Another highlight of the tenth edition was the Changemakers Conversations, a series of virtual panel discussions centred around themes such as "Our New Normal" and "Growth in Asia".

=== Centre for Research on Successful Ageing (ROSA) ===
The Centre for Research on Successful Ageing (ROSA) was established in 2020 as the successor to the Centre for Research on the Economics of Ageing (CREA), which had been founded in 2014 with support from a Ministry of Education Academic Research Fund Tier 3 grant to conduct long-term research on Singapore's ageing population.

ROSA conducts interdisciplinary research on ageing and retirement in Singapore, drawing on perspectives from economics, sociology and psychology.

The centre oversees the Singapore Life Panel (SLP), a longitudinal survey of older adults that has been used to study ageing, retirement and well-being in Singapore.

=== Singapore Green Finance Centre (SGFC) ===
The Singapore Green Finance Centre (SGFC) was established in 2020 by SMU and Imperial College London as Singapore's first centre of excellence for sustainable finance.

The centre is supported by the Monetary Authority of Singapore and a consortium of international financial institutions. Its research focuses on sustainable finance, climate finance and the transition to a low-carbon economy.

Since 2023, the centre has been led by director Nikki Kemp.

The centre has also developed educational programmes in sustainable finance, including an open online course on sustainability and sustainable finance.

=== Research for Intelligent Software Engineering (RISE) ===
The Centre for Research on Intelligent Software Engineering (RISE) was established in 2020. The centre conducts research at the intersection of software engineering, artificial intelligence and cybersecurity.

RISE is supported by funding from organisations including the National Research Foundation, the Ministry of Education, AI Singapore and the Singapore Data Science Consortium. Its research focuses on the development of intelligent software systems and the application of artificial intelligence to software engineering and cybersecurity challenges.

=== Urban Institute (UI) ===
In 2024, SMU launched the Urban Institute (UI), an interdisciplinary research institute focused on the study of urban challenges in Singapore and Asia.

The institute was launched in conjunction with the Global Alliance on Sustainable Urban Societies, a research partnership involving Boston University, the London School of Economics and Political Science, the University of Melbourne and the University of Toronto.

It focuses on urban challenges affecting Singapore and Asian cities, including sustainability, resilience and urban development.

== Rankings & Reputation ==
University rankings

Global – Overall
- ARWU World: n/a (2022)
- QS World: =411 (2026)
- QS Employability: 201–250
- QS Under 50: 81–90
- THE World: n/a (2023)
- USNWR Global: 725 (2023)

Global – Business and economics
- QS Accounting: 49
- QS Business: 36
- QS Economics: 60

Global – Law
- QS Law: 95

Global – Liberal arts
- QS Social Sciences and Management: 68

Regional – Overall
- QS Asia: = 90 (2026)

National – Business and economics
- Financial Times MBA: 58

SMU is generally considered one of the top three universities in Singapore, along with NUS and NTU.

=== World University Rankings ===
SMU made its debut on the Quacquarelli Symonds World University Rankings in 2017. SMU is ranked No. 36 in the QS Business and Management Studies Subject, No. 49 in the QS Accounting Subject, No. 60 in the QS Economics Subject, No. 68 in the QS Social Sciences and Management Subject and No. 95 band in the QS Law and Legal Studies subject. Its Master of IT in Business is ranked No. 1 in Asia and No. 14 in the world by QS Masters in Business Analytics Ranking for 2020.

==== QS broad subject areas ====
QS World University Rankings by Subject (broad subject areas) 2026:

Broad Subject Area	SMU's world rank
Accounting & Finance	50
Business and Management Studies	39
Social Sciences & Management	86
Economics	77
Computer Science and Information Systems	124
Law	56

==== Business school rankings ====
- SMU Lee Kong Chian School of Business was ranked No. 58 worldwide and No. 13 in Asia in the Financial Times' 2021 global ranking of Master of Business Administration (MBA) programmes.
- SMU Lee Kong Chian School of Business was ranked No. 76 worldwide and No. 8 in Asia in the Financial Times' 2020 global ranking of Masters in Management (MiM) programmes.
- SMU Lee Kong Chian School of Business was ranked No. 6 in the 2018 Financial Times Top 25 Business Schools: Asia-Pacific region.
- SMU Lee Kong Chian School of Business' Executive Master of Business Administration (EMBA) was ranked No. 22 worldwide by The Financial Times.
- SMU Lee Kong Chian School of Business was rated as a 4 Palmes business school and ranked second in Singapore and fourth in the Far East Asia Zone among 200 business schools 'with significant international influence' in the 'Best 1,000 Business Schools in 154 countries' ranking compiled by Eduniversal for 2020

==== Research rankings ====
- SMU Lee Kong Chian School of Business was ranked No. 21 worldwide and No. 1 in Asia in the Financial Times' 2024 Aggregated Research Ranking.
- SMU School of Computing & Information Systems was ranked 2nd in the world and 1st in Singapore for Software Engineering research output in 2023 by CSRankings.org.
- SMU Lee Kong Chian School of Business' research productivity in top ranked journals across all fields of business in 2016–17 is No. 13 worldwide according to the University of Texas Dallas ranking.
- SMU Lee Kong Chian School of Business' research productivity in top ranked journals in management field in 2016–17 is No. 2 worldwide according to the University of Texas Dallas ranking
- SMU School of Accountancy was ranked No. 1 in Asia and No. 3 in the world for both Archival Research (All Topics) and Archival Research (Financial). It also ranks No. 1 in Asia for All Areas, All Disciplines according to the Brigham Young University Accounting Research Rankings 2016
- SMU was ranked No. 64 worldwide and No. 4 in Asia in the 2016 Tilburg University Top 100 Worldwide Economics Schools Research Ranking based on research contributions in leading international journals in the preceding five-year period
- USNEWS ranks SMU's Economics and Business faculty as 77 globally.

=== Accreditation ===
SMU is the first university in Asia to be accredited by Ashoka, a global non-profit organisation supporting leading social entrepreneurs worldwide, as a Changemaker Campus as well as the first university in Singapore to be accredited as a research organisation by the Association for the Accreditation of Human Research Protection Programs, Inc. headquartered in Washington, D.C. SMU's Lee Kong Chian School of Business is one of the youngest business schools in the world and the only Singaporean business school to achieve the 'triple crown' accreditation by the AACSB, AMBA, and EQUIS.

== SMU Libraries ==
The SMU Libraries consists of the Li Ka Shing Library and the Kwa Geok Choo Law Library. The Li Ka Shing Library was officially opened on 24 February 2006.

=== Institutional Knowledge (InK) ===
InK, Institutional Knowledge at SMU is the institutional repository and archives of the Singapore Management University. It acquires, organises and provides access to the research and scholarly works of SMU faculty. Collections in InK include journal articles, working papers, conference proceedings, books, book chapters, reports and other research works including the dissertations and theses of postgraduate students and a collection of print and video teaching cases. In addition, there are also the heritage and research data collections.

== Campus and facilities ==
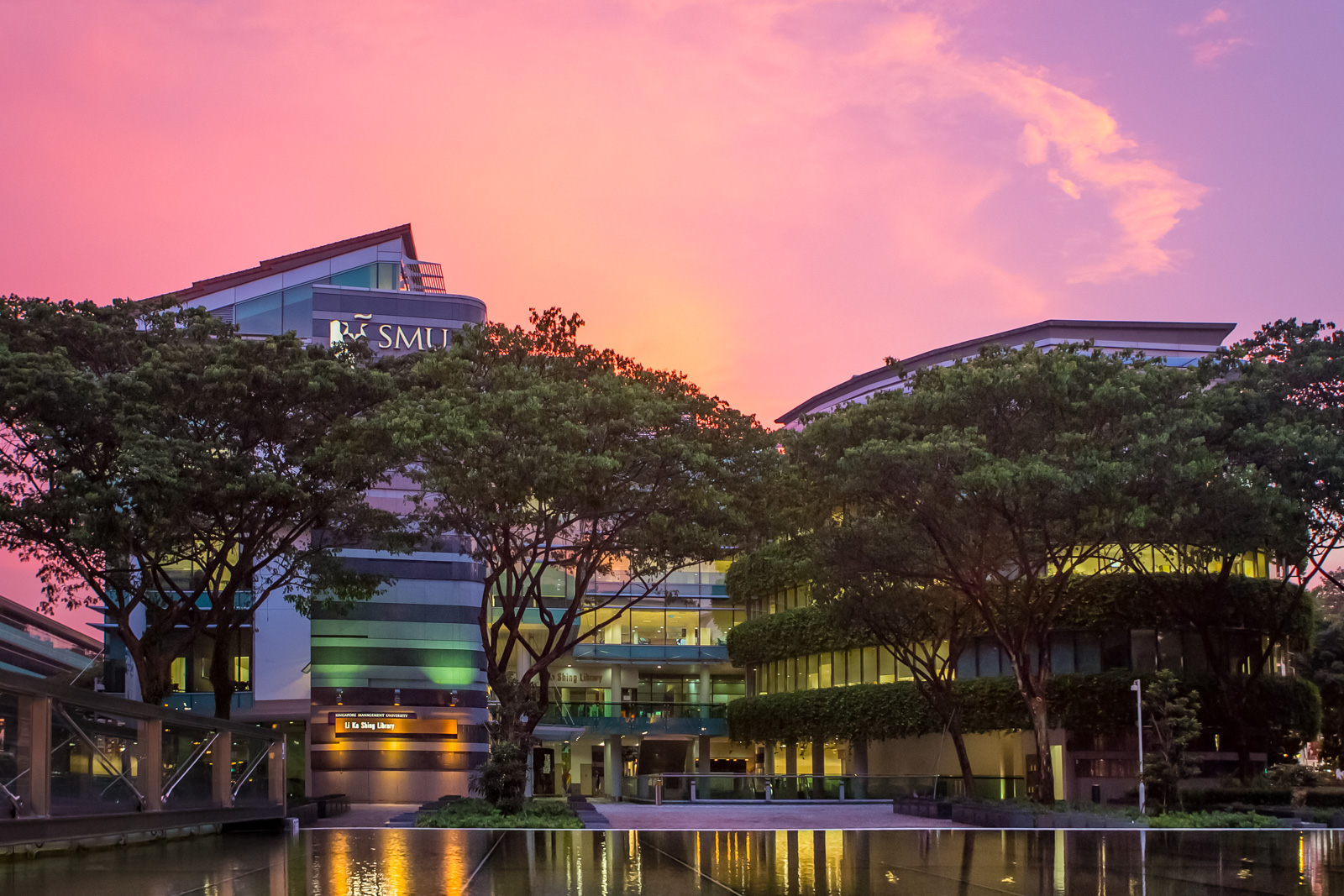
Li Ka Shing Library

The campus has 9 blocks:

- Lee Kong Chian School of Business
- School of Accountancy
- Li Ka Shing Library
- School of Computing & Information Systems 1
- School of Computing & Information Systems 2 / School of Economics
- Yong Pung How School of Law & Kwa Geok Choo Law Library
- College of Integrative Studies / School of Social Sciences
- SMU Connexion
- Administration Building

Six of the buildings are connected by an underground walkway known as the Concourse, which is open to the public and lined with shops. The campus was designed by two teams of architects, with Cox Architects and Planners and DEG Architects in charge of the Administrative Building, and Edward Cullinan Architects and KNTA Architects designing the rest.

Teaching facilities include seminar rooms, classrooms, computer labs and group study rooms used by students for project discussions. There are research facilities scattered throughout the university. Sports facilities are limited on campus because of space constraints; however, the university has a swimming pool, gymnasium and a multi-purpose sports hall which is equipped with a rock wall. The university has campus-wide wireless LAN networks.

The university had leased the former MPH Building, which housed the former flagship store of MPH Group until 2003, located at the junction of Stamford Road and Armenian Street from mid 2015 to mid 2019 to house SMU Labs. This provided collaborative learning spaces for the university's latest learning experiment, known as SMU-X, in which lessons are centred on solving real-world problems through projects. The new SMU Connexion building, built to link the School of Law and School of Accountancy, opened in 2020 as a permanent home to SMU-X and SMU Labs.

== Notable alumni ==
=== Entertainment ===
- Adithya Srinivasan – Indian singer
- Chantalle Ng – Singaporean actress
- Hubert Ng – Singaporean songwriter
- Jade Seah – Singaporean actress
- Jasmine Sokko – Singaporean singer
- Lynn Tan – Miss Universe Singapore 2012
- Nandita Banna – Miss Universe Singapore 2021
- Pornsak Prajakwit – Singaporean/Thai actor
- Rebecca Lim – Singaporean actress
- Angela Lim - ChannelNewsAsia news anchor

=== Politics ===
- Louis Chua – Singaporean politician
- Nadia Ahmad Samdin – Singaporean politician
- Pritam Singh – Singaporean politician, former Leader of the Opposition
- Zhulkarnain Abdul Rahim – Singaporean politician

=== Sports ===
- Jason Goh Koon-Jong – Singaporean chess player
- Poh Seng Song – Singaporean athlete
- Russell Ong – Singaporean swimmer
- Shanti Pereira – Singaporean athlete
- Yip Pin Xiu – Singaporean swimmer, seven-time Paralympics Gold medallist

=== Business/Tech ===
- Aaron Tan, Aditya Lesmana and Kelvin Chng - Co-founders of Carro
- Calixto Tay - CEO and co-founder of Originally US
- Derrick Lee - CEO and co-founder of Accreditify
- Lin Fengru - CEO and co-founder of TurtleTree
- Beh Min Yan - CEO and co-founder of Roboto Coding Company
- Alvin Poh - Founder of Vodien Internet Solutions
