= Janice R. Bellace =

American academic

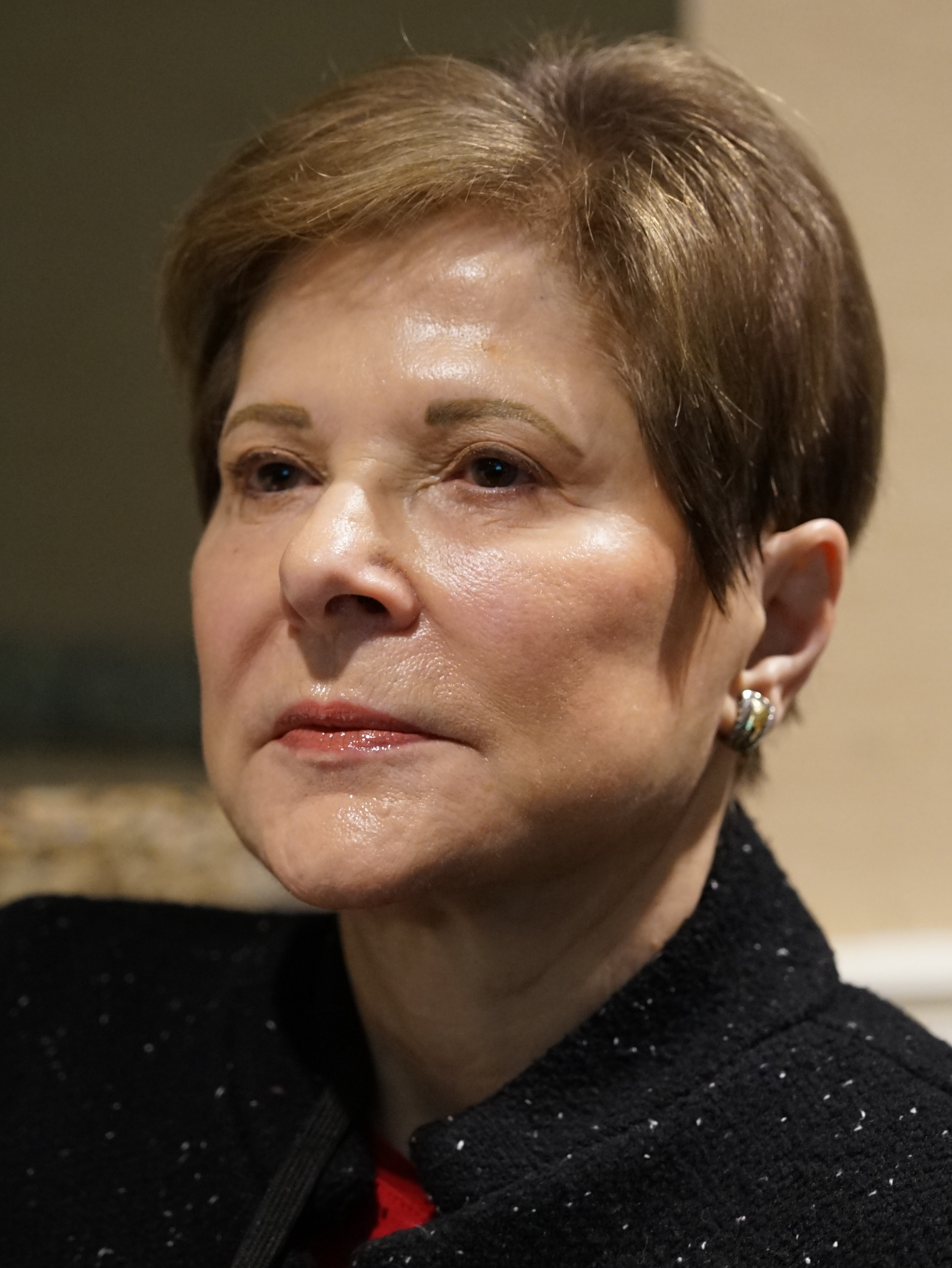
Bellace at ASSA 2026

Janice R. Bellace is a Professor Emeritus of Legal Studies & Business Ethics at the Wharton School at the University of Pennsylvania. From 1999-2001, she took leave from Wharton to serve as the first President of Singapore Management University. She is the author of numerous academic books, chapters, articles and papers; her research interests are in the field of labor and employment law, particularly international labor law.

== Education ==
Bellace received her B.A. and J.D. from the University of Pennsylvania in 1971 and 1974, respectively, and holds a M.Sc. in Industrial Relations from the London School of Economics, which she attended as a Thouron Scholar.

== Academic career ==
Bellace returned to Penn in 1977 to begin her academic career. Since that time she has held multiple positions in the school. She held the Samuel Blank Chair in Legal Studies from 1996 until 2018. She became Vice Dean for the Undergraduate Division of Wharton in 1990 and Deputy Dean in 1994. In 1999, after stepping down as Deputy Dean she spent time in Singapore and became the founding president of the Singapore Management University. Following her sabbatical she returned to Penn and became the Associate Provost of the university in 2004 and Deputy Provost from 2006 to 2007. She held the position of Director of the Huntsman Program in International Studies and Business from 2001 to 2015, and subsequently became Director of the Tanoto Initiative, an initiative of the Tanoto Foundation, in 2016.

== Notable leadership roles ==
In addition to her work at Penn, Bellace was appointed as a member of the World Bank Administrative Tribunal in 2018 and elected President of the Tribunal in 2024. She is the co-chair of the UAW public review board. She is on the board of trustees for Thomas Jefferson University Hospital and Methodist Hospital in Philadelphia. Bellace was a member of the ILO committee of experts from 1994 to 2010. She continued her relationship with Singapore Management University as a member of the board from 2001 to 2013 and as a member of the international academic review panel from 2015 to 2017. She served as a member of the international board of overseers of Koç University from 2007 until 2022. Additionally, Bellace served as the president of the International Industrial Relations Association from 2009 through the 16th IIRA World Congress in Philadelphia in June 2012. She served as president of LERA in 2017.

== Books ==
- The Right to Strike in International Law. (Hart Publishing, 2021). (with Jeffrey Vogt, Lance Compa, K D Ewing, John Hendy QC, Klaus Lörcher, and Tonia Novitz)
- Labour Law at the Crossroads: Changing Employment Relationships. (Kluwer Law International, 1997). (with M.G. Rood)
- Business and its legal environment (Prentice-Hall, 1983). (with Thomas Dunfee and Arnold Rosoff)
