= Bryan Zhang =

FinTech and Regulatory Innovation Researcher

- Education: University of Cambridge, University of Oxford
- Occupations: FinTech expert and non-executive director
- Known for: FinTech and regulatory innovation

Bryan Zheng Zhang is a prominent academic and financial technology expert who is co-founder and the executive director of the Cambridge Centre for Alternative Finance, and co-founder of Financial Innovation for Impact. He is also a non-executive director of the UK Financial Conduct Authority since 2024, chairing its Board Risk Committee and also a member of the Audit Committee and People Committee.

Zhang has led and co-authored over 50 regional and global fintech market and regulatory reports. His commentary has appeared in articles from a number of media outlets, including the BBC, the Financial Times, and City A.M..

He is a member of the Bank of England's CBDC Engagement Forum, the OECD's Steering Group on SME & Entrepreneurship Finance, International Monetary Fund's FAS Advisory Group, the Innovation Panel of the Dubai International Financial Centre, and a member of the Bretton Woods Committee. Additionally, he co-chairs the Future of Global FinTech initiative in partnership with the World Economic Forum. Bryan served as a final round judge for Bank for International Settlements and Reserve Bank of India's G20 TechSprint on cross-border payments in 2023.

In 2022, he was appointed by the Payment Systems Regulator and the Financial Conduct Authority as the Independent Chair of a Strategic Working Group to help shape the future development of Open Banking in the United Kingdom

Bryan's academic background includes training in Economic Geography and Public Policy at the University of Cambridge and at the University of Oxford. He is an Associate of the Senior Common Room (ASCR) at King's College, Cambridge and a member of the editorial board for the Journal of Alternative Finance, a double anonymised hybrid journal that addresses the technological evolution of the financial sector and its impacts. Bryan also worked as an executive for Oxfam in international development and served on its governance body Oxfam Association for two consecutive terms between 2006 - 2012.
