= Hubert Ng =

Singaporean singer-songwriter (born 1992)

Hubert Ng 黄宇哲
- Born: 18 September 1992 (age 34); Singapore
- Genres: Mandopop; Pop music
- Occupations: Singer-songwriter; music producer
- Years active: 2017–present
- Spouse: Lulu (m. 2024)

Hubert Ng (Chinese: 黄宇哲; pinyin: Huáng Yǔ Zhé; born 18 September 1992) is a Singaporean singer-songwriter and music producer.

== Early life and education ==
Ng was born on 18 September 1992 in Singapore. He married his wife, Lulu, a model booker, on 19 September 2024. Their daughter, Toto, was born on 2 August 2025. Ng attended Raffles Junior College and Singapore Management University.

== Career ==
Hubert released his personal album in 2015, and it soared to #1 album on iTunes. He later flew to Taiwan to further his studies. While studying, he composed and produced for various notable artistes in the Mandopop industry.

Hubert rose to fame in 2017 after he wrote a song titled Ni Ni. The song topped Taiwan- originated music-streaming service KKBox's chart for more than a month last year, overtaking hits by Mandopop stars such as Jay Chou and Hebe Tien.

Hubert was invited and asked to write soundtracks for movies and television shows.

== Accolades ==
Year	Award	Results	Ref.
2021	*SCAPE Producer Of The Year	Won	
2021	腾讯音乐娱乐盛典 年度最佳游戏歌曲	Won	

== Discography ==
Year	Album title	Singer	Song (Areas Participated In)
2017	妮妮	那对夫妻 Kim	妮妮（曲，制作）
2017	妮妮	那对夫妻 Kim	那对夫妻（曲，制作
2017	妮妮	那对夫妻 Kim	父母（曲，制作）爱的厘米电视剧插曲
2017	妮妮	那对夫妻 Kim	我不会（曲，制作）
2017	妮妮	那对夫妻 Kim	紫微啊紫微（曲，制作）
2017	妮妮	那对夫妻 Kim	我会（曲，制作
2017	妮妮	那对夫妻 Kim	只想对你说（词，曲，制作）
2017	蔡佩轩	蔡佩轩	你说你爱我（词，曲，制作）
2017	蔡佩轩	蔡佩轩	宣言（词，曲，制作）
2017	蔡佩轩	蔡佩轩	为了等候你（制作）
2023	Be Your Light	李鑫一	Rex-Log（曲)
2023	CALLING	XODIAC	CALLING（词，曲)
2023	HI	林墨 (Ex Into1)	HI（曲)
2023	STAY	周柯宇（Ex Into1)	STAY（词，曲，編曲)
2023	纵横宇宙	鹿晗 LUHAN	Spider-Man: Across The Spider-Verse 中文主题曲（曲)
2023	比肩而战	GAI	TRANSFORMERS《變形金剛：超能勇士崛起》電影主題曲（制作，曲，編曲)
2023	同频	伯远(Ex Into 1)	同频（词)
2023	18当燃	Liu Yu(Ex Into 1)	18当燃（词曲)
2023	时光的礼物	王者荣耀周年庆(无限王者团)	时光的礼物（曲)
2023	光与夜之恋 Light and Night	Anoynymous	BOOGIE 浮梦夏日长 PV（词）
2024	SO WHY	郑乃馨	SO WHY（词）
2024	ALL MINE	maxleelilun	ALL MINE（词，曲，编）
2024	血脉觉醒	宝石GEM	AQUAMAN 《海王2：失落的王国》中文推广曲（曲）
2024	CREME BRULEE	XODIAC	HEYDAY （词，曲，编）
2024	FOREVER GIRL	KISMYFT2	SYNOPSIS （曲，编）
2024	ONE	(G)I-DLE YUQI	Transformers ONE （制作，曲，词，编曲）
2024	SEASONS OF YOU	TRENDZ	SEASONS OF YOU （制作，曲，词，编曲）
2024	我们走过人海	bertandlulu	我们走过人海 （制作，曲，词）
2024	想和你	bertandlulu	想和你（制作，曲，词）
2024	做蛇么都LUCKY	bertandlulu	做蛇么都LUCKY（制作，曲，词）
2024	用猪打败深刻	苏勋伦	用猪打败深刻（曲）
2025	计算浪漫	艾薇 IVY	计算浪漫（曲，词）
2025	需要你陪	bertandlulu	需要你陪（制作，曲，词，编曲）
2025	传祺向往	袁娅维 TIA RAY, 张远，柳爽，温奕心	传祺向往S7主题曲（曲）
2025	TRAUMA 伤	刘耀文 时代少年团	K. NIGHT 耀（曲，编曲）
2025	渴望就可能	TOP登陆少年组合	PEPSI 百事可乐品牌主题曲（制作，曲，编曲）
2025	无所谓计划EMERGENCY	TOP登陆少年组合	无所畏惧（曲）
2025	生来不让	十个勤天	CCTV x Tencent Music Entertainment（曲，编曲）
2025	狂歡天才	林墨	狂欢天才（曲，编曲）
2025	独爱	刘宇宁	与晋长安 Shadow Love 战斗曲（曲，编曲）
2025	宿命之上	张靓颖	与晋长安 Shadow Love 主题曲（曲，编曲）
2025	IDWW	TIOT	I Don't Wanna Wait（曲，编曲）
2025	Burn Me Into The Light	i-DLE Minnie & i-DLE ShuHua	回魂记 The Resurrected 宣传曲（曲，词）
2025	Coming For You	ZHANGHAO (ZEROBASEONE)	骄阳似我 OST（曲）
我看见的未来	李圣杰	Face III 未来（曲）	
2026	Big Guy 计划	沈月	Spongebob Movie Chinese Theme Song（制作，曲）
2026	人造神	丁程鑫	人造神 （词，曲，编曲，制作）
2026	SYNDICATE	YANTING/ JFYT	SYNDICATE （曲，编曲）
2026	黑与红	马嘉祺	黑与红 （词，曲，编曲，制作）
