= Stanley Dissanaike =

Sri Lankan parasitologist

Anselm Stanley Dissanaike (1925–2015) was a distinguished Sri Lankan parasitologist renowned for his significant contributions to medical science and parasitology. In recognition of his scientific achievements, the University of London awarded him a Doctor of Science (DSc) in 1966. Two parasite species were named in his honor: Bilorchis dissanaikei, a trematode, and Plasmodium dissanaikei, a malarial parasite of parakeets, the latter discovered by one of his former students in London.

== Early life and education ==
Stanley Dissanaike was born on 29 October 1925 in Colombo, Sri Lanka. He received his early education at Richmond College, Galle, and St. Peter's College, Colombo. He later attended the University of Ceylon, where he earned a BSc in Zoology with first-class honors, specializing in parasitology.

He pursued further studies in medicine, graduating with distinction and receiving several first-class honors and medals from the Faculty of Medicine, University of Ceylon. In 1954, he completed his PhD at the London School of Hygiene and Tropical Medicine, under the supervision of Professor Cyril Garnham, FRS.

== Academic and professional career ==
=== University roles ===
Stanley held several academic and administrative roles throughout his career. He served as the Dean of the Faculty of Medicine at the University of Ceylon (Colombo) from 1967 to 1970 and was the Chair in Parasitology from 1964 to 1972. Later, he joined the University of Malaya in Kuala Lumpur, where he held the Chair in Parasitology.

=== Research contributions ===
Dissanaike's research focused on identifying parasites of zoonotic importance and elucidating the life cycles of several parasites in Sri Lanka and Malaysia. His work highlighted the role of parasites in crossing species barriers, a concept that remains crucial to modern infectious disease research.

In 1978, he joined the World Health Organization's Special Program for Research and Training in Tropical Diseases (TDR) in Geneva, where he contributed to global health initiatives. Even after his retirement, he remained an active member of the WHO Expert Committee on General Parasitology.

== Recognition and honors ==
- Doctor of Science (DSc): Awarded by the University of London in 1966.
- Fellowship of the Royal College of Pathologists (UK): Conferred in 1977.
- Professor Emeritus: Conferred by the University of Colombo in 1995.

== Personal life ==
Stanley's family included notable academics and professionals. His elder brother, Ben Dissanaike, was a former President of the Institute of Chemistry in Sri Lanka and Head of the Government Analysts' Department. His younger brother, Professor George Dissanaike, was a physicist and a respected academic.

== Legacy ==
Stanley's contributions to parasitology are immortalized through the naming of two parasites:

- Bilorchis dissanaikei (a trematode)
- Plasmodium dissanaikei (a malarial parasite of parakeets)
