= Sucheta Nadkarni =

Sucheta Subash Nadkarni (1967–13 October 2019) was an academic in the field of management. She was born in India but spent most of her academic life in the USA and UK. She was known for her research on upper echelons and behavioural strategy. Her most heavily cited papers explored the "people side of strategy" by seeking to answer questions such as how do CEOs and top management teams shape key strategic behaviors such as innovation, entrepreneurship and strategic flexibility. Her later work centred on gender diversity and gender representation on corporate boards.

== Biography ==
Nadkarni held the Sinyi Professorship of Chinese Management at the Judge Business School at the University of Cambridge until her death in October 2019. She was the Strategy and International Business subject group head at the school and a director of the Cambridge Wo+Men's Leadership Centre. She was a Fellow of Newnham College.

She was described in her obituary as "a force of nature, with enormous energy and drive and a great love for her work, publishing consistently and regularly in the top journals in her field."

Before joining the University of Cambridge, Nadkarni was an academic in the United States, teaching at universities such as Drexel University in Philadelphia and the University of Nebraska–Lincoln. She received her undergraduate and master's degree in commerce from the University of Mumbai, and a Ph.D. degree from the University of Kansas in 2001. She was a theme track chair at the 37th. Annual Strategic Management Society Conference in Houston in 2017. She served as the associate program chair (program chair elect) of the behavioral strategy group at the 39th. Annual Strategic Management Conference in Minneapolis in 2019.

Sucheta Nadkarni published extensively in leading academic journals including Academy of Management Journal, Administrative Science Quarterly, Strategic Management Journal, Organization Science and the Journal of Applied Psychology. Her work on gender representation on corporate boards and sex differences in leadership was extensively featured in the media including The New York Times, CNBC, Forbes, The Financial Times, Huffington Post, The Guardian, The Daily Telegraph, The Economic Times, The Times of India and TEDx.

She was an associate editor of the Academy of Management Journal and served as an associate editor of the Journal of Management.

She led research projects and grants with companies such as BNY Mellon, Newton Investment Management, and the 30% club.
