= Gishan Dissanaike =

Financial Economist

- Born: Gishan Dissanaike; Sri Lanka
- Education: Trinity College, Kandy; University of Peradeniya (BScEcon); Cambridge University - Trinity College (MPhil, PhD)
- Occupations: Economist, Academic

Gishan Dissanaike is a Sri Lankan financial economist. He is the Dean of Cambridge Judge Business School and holds the Adam Smith Professorial Chair in Corporate Governance at the University of Cambridge. He has previously been the Head of the Finance & Accounting Subject Group at Cambridge University's Judge Business School. He was also the Director of the Cambridge MPhil Programme in Finance, a cross-faculty programme involving three faculties - the Faculty of Economics, Faculty of Mathematics and Cambridge Judge Business School. He is the son of George Dissanaike.

== Education ==
Dissanaike had his schooling at Trinity College, Kandy, where he was awarded the Ryde Gold Medal. He completed his undergraduate education at the University of Peradeniya, and obtained a First Class Honours degree in economics. Gishan also won the P.D. Khan Gold Medal for the best performance in Economics and the Arts Faculty Scholarship for the best performance in the faculty.

He then went up to Trinity College, Cambridge, and obtained his MPhil and PhD in economics from the University of Cambridge. He won an External Research Studentship for Economics, awarded by Trinity College, Cambridge, and an Overseas Research Studentship, awarded by the Committee of Vice-chancellors and Principals of the Universities of the UK.
