= Mauro Guillén =

Spanish-American sociologist (born 1964)

Mauro F. Guillén (born 1964) is a Spanish-American sociologist and political economist who is currently the William H. Wurster Professor of Multinational Management at the Wharton School. In March 2021, he was named Dean of the Cambridge Judge Business School, and a Fellow of Queens' College at the University of Cambridge; he returned to Wharton in 2023. Until July 2021, he directed the Penn Lauder Center for International Business Education and Research, and was the Anthony L. Davis Director of the Joseph H. Lauder Institute of Management and International Studies from 2007 to 2019. His book 2030: How Today's Biggest Trends Will Collide and Reshape the Future of Everything was a Wall Street Journal bestseller and a Financial Times Book of the Year.

== Biography ==
=== Education ===
Born in Spain, Guillén graduated from the University of Oviedo in 1987 with a BA in political economy and business management. He arrived in the United States in 1987 to study sociology at Yale University; his education at Yale was sponsored by the Bank of Spain and the Fulbright Program. He received a PhD in sociology from Yale in 1992, writing his dissertation under the direction of sociologists Charles Perrow, Paul DiMaggio, and Juan J. Linz; it was later published as a book, titled Models of Management (University of Chicago Press, 1994). Whilst at Yale, he also completed the requirements for a doctoral degree in political economy from University of Oviedo, which he received in 1991 after defending a thesis on health inequality in Spain.

His earliest intellectual mentors were Jesús M. de Miguel and Alvaro Cuervo García (under whom he studied). He considers the cultural anthropologist Clifford Geertz and the political economist Albert Hirschman to be his most important intellectual influences; he met both figures while a member of the Institute for Advanced Study in Princeton, New Jersey.

=== Career ===
Between 1992 and 1996, Guillén taught at the MIT Sloan School of Management. He moved to the Wharton School in 1996 after his wife, Sandra Suárez, accepted a faculty position that year at Temple University. At Wharton, Guillén became an associate professor with tenure in 2000, and a full professor in 2003. He was appointed the Dr. Felix Zandman Endowed Professor in International Management that year, a chair established in honor of the chemist who founded the Fortune 500 semiconductor company Vishay Intertechnology. He was certified by the Spanish Education Ministry as a Full Professor (Catedrático) in 2010.

Guillén is a Fellow of the Sociological Research Association, a Fellow of the Macro Organizational Behavior Society, a former Guggenheim Fellow, and a member of the Institute for Advanced Study in Princeton. In 2005 he won the IV Fundación Banco Herrero Prize, awarded annually to the best Spanish social scientist under the age of 40. In 2013 he received the Aspen Institute's Faculty Pioneer Award. He delivered the 2014 Clarendon Lectures in Management at the University of Oxford.

At Wharton, Guillén teaches undergraduates, MBA students, PhD students, and executives. He has received a Wharton MBA Core Teaching Award, a Wharton Graduate Association Teaching Award, a Wharton Teaching Commitment and Curricular Innovation Award, and a Wharton “Goes Above and Beyond the Call of Duty” Teaching Award. As the Anthony L. Davis Director of the Joseph H. Lauder Institute of Management and International Studies, he launched many programs and initiatives, including the Global Knowledge Lab, the TrendLab on Globalization, the Lauder Culture Quest, the Global Program, and the Lauder Entrepreneurship Modules.

=== Other activities ===
His professional activities include being, or having been, Vice-Chair of the Global Agenda Council on Emerging Multinationals at the World Economic Forum, trustee of the Madrid Institute of Advanced Study in the Social Sciences, and member of the advisory boards of the research department of Caixabank, Conciban, and the Escuela de Finanzas Applicadas (Grupo Analistas). He also serves or has served on the editorial boards of over ten scholarly journals, and as associate editor of the Administrative Science Quarterly. He is a member of the Jury for the Princess of Asturias International Prize for the Social Sciences. Since 2015 he has served as trustee of the Fundación Princesa de Asturias.

An avid traveler, Guillén’s hobbies include history and architecture. In 2006 Princeton University Press published his book, The Taylorized Beauty of the Mechanical, which explored the connections between scientific management and modernist architecture between 1890 and 1940 in various parts of the world. He was a member of the University of Oviedo team that won the Spain National Basketball University Championship in 1987, and of Club Baloncesto Elosúa León from 1980 to 1983.

== Work ==
Mauro Guillén is best known for his comparative studies of companies and management practices in a variety of countries, especially in Western Europe, Latin America, and East Asia. More recently, he has devoted most of his research and teaching to the topics of globalization and the rise of the emerging-market multinationals.

At the present time, Guillén is engaged in research on the new political economy of the twenty-first century, and on the rise of multinational firms from emerging economies. He is the co-author of two recent books, one on Global Turning Points: Understanding the Challenges for Business in the Twenty-First Century, with Emilio Ontiveros (Cambridge University Press), and the other on Emerging Markets Rule: Growth Strategies of the New Global Giants, with Esteban García-Canal (McGraw-Hill).

He is the author of a dozen books and over 30 scholarly articles, published by the most prestigious university presses and competitive scholarly journals. He is also a consultant and frequent public speaker, and appears regularly in TV and radio programs.

His books and articles have earned Guillén the Gulf Publishing Company Best Paper Award of the Academy of Management, the W. Richard Scott Best Paper Award of the American Sociological Association, the Gustavus Myers Center Award for Outstanding Book on Human Rights, and the President’s Book Award of the Social Science History Association. He was identified in 2009 by Science Watch as being among the top one percent of scholars in the fields of Economics & Business, and Social Sciences. He has received fellowships from the Fundación Rafael del Pino, the John Simon Guggenheim Memorial Foundation, the Marion and Jasper Whiting Foundation, and the Fulbright/Spanish Ministry of Education program.

Guillén is a frequent commentator on Bloomberg TV and National Public Radio, and has also appeared on BBC Radio, CNBC, ABC Action News, CNN en español, and CBS News Radio. He writes a monthly op-ed column for The Korea Times on global economic issues (co-authored with Emilio Ontiveros). He has also published articles in the China Daily, Financial Times, Chronicle of Higher Education, and El País, and other newspapers. He has been quoted in over 100 media outlets, including the Boston Globe, the Chicago Tribune, the Economist Intelligence Unit’s Executive Briefing, Entrepreneur magazine, Financial Times, Forbes, Foreign Policy, the Los Angeles Times, the New York Newsday, Newsweek, the New York Times, Investor’s Business Daily, the International Herald Tribune, the Journal of Commerce, The Economist, USA Today, the Wall Street Journal, Wall Street Journal Europe, Wall Street Journal Americas, and World Trade.

== Selected publications ==
- Guillén, Mauro F. Models of management: Work, authority, and organization in a comparative perspective. University of Chicago Press, 1994.
- Guillén, Mauro F. Symbolic Unity, Dynastic Continuity, and Countervailing Power: Monarchies, Republics, and the Economy. Social Forces, soy037. 2018.
- Guillén, Mauro F. 2030: How Today's Biggest Trends Will Collide and Reshape the Future of Everything. Macmillan, 2020 .

Articles, a selection:

- Guillen, Mauro F. "Business groups in emerging economies: A resource-based view." Academy of Management Journal 43.3 (2000): 362-380.
- Guillén, Mauro F. "Is globalization civilizing, destructive or feeble? A critique of five key debates in the social science literature." Annual Review of Sociology (2001): 235-260.
- Schneper, William D., and Mauro F. Guillén. "Stakeholder rights and corporate governance: A cross-national study of hostile takeovers." Administrative Science Quarterly 49.2 (2004): 263-295.
- Henisz, Witold J., Bennet A. Zelner, and Mauro F. Guillén. "The worldwide diffusion of market-oriented infrastructure reform, 1977–1999." American Sociological Review 70.6 (2005): 871-897.
