= Lily Kong =

Singaporean academic

Professor Lily Kong BBM PPA(P) FBA
- 江莉莉
- Born: 1965 (age 60–61); Singapore
- Occupation: President of Singapore Management University
- Awards: Public Administration Medal (Silver)

Academic background
- Education: National University of Singapore; University College London

Academic work
- Discipline: Geography
- Sub-discipline: Cultural geography
- Institutions: Singapore Management University; National University of Singapore
- Main interests: Religion; Cultural policy and creative economy; National identity; Globalisation and migration; Social construction of nature and the environment

Lily Kong is a socio-cultural geographer and urban scholar currently serving as president of Singapore Management University (SMU). She is the first Singaporean female to helm a Singapore university. Kong's leadership at SMU has focused on digital transformation, sustainability, and Asia-focused growth through the university's SMU2025 and SMU2030 strategic plans.

She previously served as provost of SMU and vice-president of the National University of Singapore (NUS).

== Education ==
Kong graduated from the National University of Singapore (NUS) in 1986 with a Bachelor of Arts (First Class Honours) in geography; her honours thesis was titled Environmental Cognition: The Malay World in Colonial Fiction. She remained at NUS to earn an MA in geography in 1988, completing a master's thesis titled Mental Images: The World View of Singapore Students.

In 1991, Kong obtained a PhD in geography at University College London. Her doctoral research, The Sacred and the Secular: A Study of Contemporary Meanings and Values for Religious Buildings in Singapore, explored the intersection of religion and place. This research laid the foundation for her later work in urban cultural geography and the study of social and cultural change in Asia.

== Career ==
=== National University of Singapore ===
Kong joined the faculty of the NUS Department of Geography in 1991. She served as the Dean of the Faculty of Arts and Social Sciences from 2000 to 2003, and as Dean of the University Scholars Programme from 2002 to 2005. Kong subsequently held several senior administrative roles at NUS, including vice-president (University and Global Relations), vice provost (Education), and vice provost (Academic Personnel).

During her tenure at NUS, she also served as director of the Asia Research Institute (2008–2010) and was the acting executive vice president (Academic Affairs) of Yale-NUS College. Kong was a key figure in the institution's internationalization efforts, notably overseeing the 2011 launch of Yale-NUS College.

=== Singapore Management University ===
In September 2015, Kong joined SMU as provost and Lee Kong Chian Chair Professor of Social Sciences. On 1 January 2019, she succeeded Arnoud De Meyer as president of SMU, becoming the first Singaporean academic to lead the university. As president, Kong has focused on faculty and student development, expanding the impact of the university's research, and reforming sexual harassment policies.

== Fellowships and academic initiatives ==
Throughout her academic career, Kong has been associated with a number of fellowships and academic initiatives that have supported scholarship, international exchange and public discourse.

Her research in social, cultural and urban geography was supported by international fellowships, including a Fulbright Fellowship., a Commonwealth Fellowship, and a fellowship from the Geographical Society of China. These fellowships facilitated research and academic exchange in the United States, United Kingdom and China.

In 2024, Kong was appointed the 15th S R Nathan fellow for the Study of Singapore by the Institute of Policy Studies. As part of the fellowship, she delivered a three-part lecture series titled Universities Reinvented: Shaping Legacy and Impact for a New World. The first lecture, Through the Looking Glass: Insights into the Origin and Evolution of Universities, examined the historical development of universities and their changing role in society. The second lecture, At the Crossroads: Universities for the 100-Year Life, explored how universities can remain relevant in an era of longer life expectancy and lifelong learning. The third lecture, Beyond the Ivory Tower: Research and the Dilemmas of Quality and Relevance, discussed the role of universities as centres of knowledge creation and the balance between academic excellence and societal impact.

== Public engagement and leadership ==
Kong has been a member of Singapore's Public Service Commission since 2009, a constitutional appointment responsible for senior-public-sector recruitment.

She currently chairs the World Cities Summit Knowledge Council. She also serves on national and philanthropic boards including the Temasek Trust Limited Board of Directors, and the President's Challenge Council.

== Research and publications ==
Kong has served as an editor or editorial board member for more than 15 international journals, including Social and Cultural Geography and Dialogues in Human Geography. She is a series editor of Pacific Rim Geographies: Studies on Contemporary Culture, Environment, Cities and Development (Routledge), co-chief editor of the ARI-Springer Asia Series, and a book series advisor for The Politics of Popular Culture in Asia Pacific (University of Illinois Press and Hong Kong University Press).

As an author, she has published 12 books and monographs, alongside over 150 peer-reviewed journal articles and book chapters. Her research interests include religion, cultural policy and creative economy, national identity, globalization and migration, and the social construction of nature and the environment.

Her early scholarship explored the relationship between religion and place in urban settings, resulting in publications such as The Sacred and the Secular: Religion and Politics in Singapore (1993) and Negotiating Conceptions of Sacred Space (1993). These studies analyzed sociocultural and urban geography in Southeast Asia. her subsequent research shifted toward cultural industries, heritage spaces, and creative economies, examining the social meanings of urban development in globalizing Asian cities. Her later monographs include Arts, Culture and the Making of Global Cities (2015) and Religion and Space: Competition, Conflict and Violence in the Contemporary World (2016).

Kong's research focuses on sociocultural and urban geography, specifically examining how urban transformation, religion and cultural practices shape lived experiences in Asian cities.

Her work has been reviewed in academic journals such as Urban Geography and Progress in Human Geography, which noted her contributions to debates on Asian urbanism and the globalization of cultural economies.

== Bibliography ==
- Convent Chronicles: History of a Pioneer Mission School for Girls in Singapore (1994)
- The Planning and Ecology of Park Connector Systems in Urban Areas (1997)
- Singapore: A Developmental City-State (1997)
- Joo Chiat: A Living Legacy (2001)
- Landscapes: Ways of Imagining the World (2003)
- The Politics of Landscape in Singapore: Constructions of "Nation" (2003)
- Singapore's Hawker Centres (2007)
- Conserving the Past, Creating the Future: Urban Heritage in Singapore (2011)
- Arts, Culture and the Making of Global Cities: Creating New Urban Landscapes in Asia (2015)
- Religion and Space: Competition, Conflict and Violence in the Contemporary World (2016)
- Singapore Hawker Centres: People, Places, Food 2nd ed. (2023)
- Universities Reinvented – Shaping Legacy and Impact for a New World (2025)

== Awards ==
In September 2020, Kong was announced as one of the 25 outstanding female leaders in the Asia-Pacific region according to Forbes' list of 2020 Asia's Power Businesswomen.

Professor Kong's scholarly contributions to social-cultural and urban geography have been internationally recognised. The Royal Geographical Society awarded her the Victoria Medal in 2024, citing her "conspicuous merit in research in urban, social and cultural geographies".

Kong is a recipient of the following awards:

- National Book Development Council of Singapore Book Award, 1996
- NUS Outstanding University Researcher Award, 1997
- Fulbright Fellowship Award, 1998-1999
- Public Administration Medal (Silver), 2006
- Pingat Pentadbiran Awam (Perak), 2006
- Honorary Doctor of Science, Loughborough University, 2006
- Association of American Geographers Robert Stoddard Award for Distinguished Service (Geography of Religion and Belief Systems), 2009
- Bintang Bakti Masyarakat (Public Service Star), 2020
- 15th SR Nathan Fellow, 2024
- Foreign Fellow of the Geographical Society of China, 2024
- Elected Fellow of the British Academy, 2025
- Business Times Sustainability Impact Award (Impact Leader of the Year), 2025
- NUS Faculty of Arts and Social Sciences Teaching Excellence Award
- Commonwealth Fellowship Award
