= George Dissanaike =

- Born: George Alexander Dissanaike; June 23, 1927; Galle, Sri Lanka
- Died: July 4, 2008 (aged 81)
- Education: Richmond College, Galle; St Peter's College, Colombo; University of Ceylon (BSc-Physics); Cambridge University - Downing College (PhD
- Occupations: Physicist, Academic
- Children: Gishan Dissanaike
- Relatives: Stanley Dissanaike (brother)

George Alexander Dissanaike (1927–2008), also known as "GAD", was an emeritus Professor of Physics at the University of Peradeniya, Sri Lanka. He was also a Fellow of the National Academy of Sciences, and a former President of the Institute of Physics.

He received his primary and secondary education at Richmond College, Galle, and St. Peter's College, Colombo. In 1945, he entered the University of Ceylon, Colombo, and graduated with a BSc degree in physics in 1949. He was awarded the Government University Science Scholarship for postgraduate studies. He obtained his PhD from Cambridge University in 1953. He was a research student in experimental nuclear physics at the Cavendish Laboratory and a member of Downing College, Cambridge. He also collaborated with his brother, Professor Stanley Dissanaike DSc (London), who was an eminent parasitologist and Dean of the Colombo Medical Faculty. George Dissanaike was named after his paternal great-grandfather, Mudaliyar Don George Alexander Seneviratne Dissanaike, an early 19th century chieftain.
