= Raghavendra Rau =

American finance academic

Raghavendra Rau holds the Sir Evelyn de Rothschild Professorship of Finance at the Judge Business School at the University of Cambridge, and is the Mercer's School Memorial Professor of Commerce at Gresham College. He is a founding director of the Cambridge Centre for Alternative Finance.

Before joining the University of Cambridge, Rau was an academic in the US teaching at universities such as the University of California at Berkeley, the University of California at Los Angeles and Purdue University. He received his undergraduate degree in chemistry from Delhi University in 1987, an MBA from IIM Bangalore in 1989, and a Ph.D. degree from INSEAD in 1997. He is a past president of the European Finance Association, and the program chair for the 2023 annual meeting of the Financial Management Association in Chicago.

Rau is known for his research on market efficiency. His most heavily cited papers have been one that showed how glamour acquirers (acquirers with a high market-to-book ratio) underperformed relative to value acquirers in the long-term after making an acquisition, one that showed how firms that added a dotcom to the ends of their names during the 1999-2001 dotcom bubble experienced a surge in their stock prices, and one that showed how firms in Hong Kong tunnel value away from their minority shareholders using related party transactions.

He is a past editor of Financial Management. He serves on the editorial boards of the Journal of Corporate Finance, Journal of Banking and Finance, and Financial Review.

He won the Ig Nobel Prize in Management in 2015 for his paper "What does not kill you will only make you risk-loving: Early-life disasters and CEO behavior".
