= Sucheta Kadethankar =

Indian sportswoman (born 1977)

Sport
- Country: India
- Sport: Yoga, Adventure Sports, Vedic and Yogic Counselling
- Event: Gobi 2011

Sucheta Kadethankar (Marathi: सुचेता कडेठाणकर; born 1977) is an Indian sportswoman from Pune India. She is currently known to be an accomplished Yoga Teacher and is also known for becoming the first Indian to walk across the Gobi Desert, on 15 July 2011. She walked a distance of 1,000 miles (1,600 km) in Mongolia, Asia's largest desert. Kadethankar was part of a 13-member team from nine countries The guided expedition was supported by four-wheel drive truck, local Mongolian guides and 12 Bactrian camels.

== Profession ==
Sucheta has a master's degree (MA) in Yogashastra and is also expert in Sanskrit. She runs her Yoga teaching institute Koham Fit's Koham Yoga Shala which is based in Pune. Her Online and Offline Yoga classes along with a team of great teachers who are also trained through her Yoga Teacher Training Courses are known for authentic teaching. She conducts Online sessions for studying Indian scriptures like Patanjala Yoga Darshana, Tattvabodha, in addition to Vedic Chanting. She is known for and prefers to have long-term association with her Yoga students. Most of her programs like Parivartana and an upcoming program of Brahma Muhurta Sadhana are year-long programs.

== Biography ==
Sucheta holds a post graduate degree in history from the Fergusson College in Pune. She also holds Masters in Yogashastra. She was initially a journalist. She then became an IT professional, employed as a Lead Information Developer in Symantec. Her passionate hobby, as an amateur sports person, is adventure sports involving trekking in mountains, cycling, river crossing and desert walk. She has participated in trekking to the Mount Everest Base Camp in 2008 and then several Himalayan treks and expeditions. She has done a very large number of treks in the Sahyadri Mountains.

=== Gobi desert walk ===
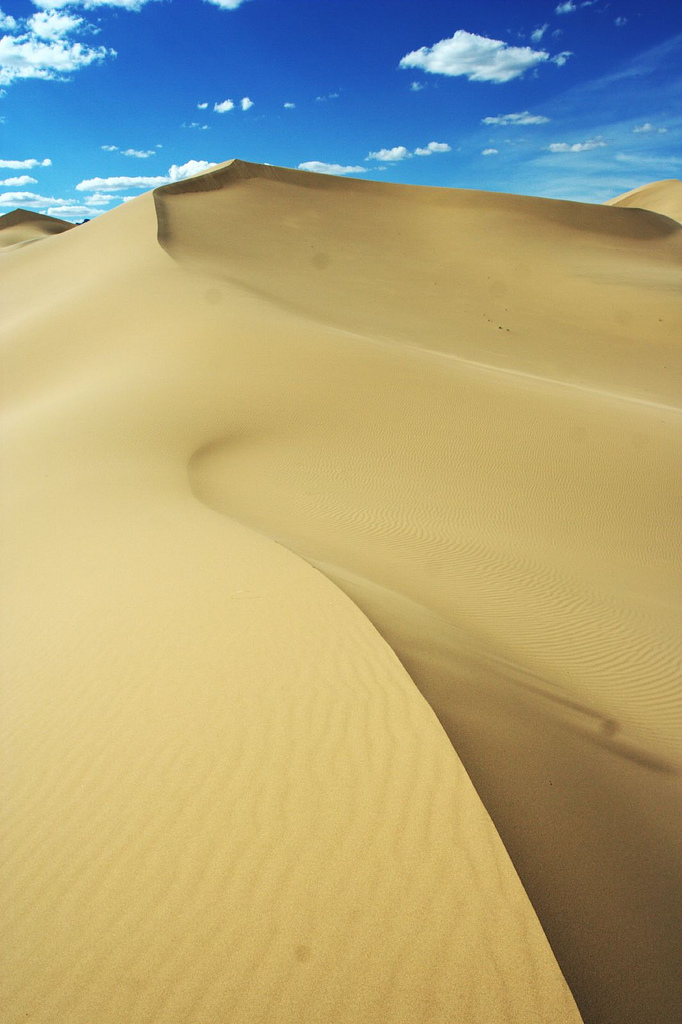
Gobi Desert sand dune in Mongolia

The Gobi trek that Kadethankar completed, titled "Gobi Crossing 2011", was an event organized by the Explore Foundation of Ireland. It catered to young people who wished to explore the wild desert of Gobi (the fifth largest desert in the world) in Mongolia. It was planned as a 60-day trek covering a distance of 1,600 kilometres (990 mi). Kadethankar was one of 13 selected walkers, including Christopher Schrader (who became the youngest person to cross the Gobi Desert on foot) and Faraz Shibli (who became the youngest Briton to do the same). The team included seven women but only three of them endured the trek to the last; Kadethankar was one of them. Her expenses for the expedition were US$7000, while her travel was met by her employer Symantec. It was a charity trek to support the Edu Relief, a Mongolian NGO, to support free education to students in Mongolia. The trek route was described by Kadethankar as drab, dreary and endless.

After Kadethankar registered to participate in the trek, she trained for six months by walking every day from her office and back, a distance of 24 kilometres (15 mi), carrying a heavy backpack.

The trek was in a west to east direction, to the north of the Khongoryn Els (one of the largest sand dunes in Mongolia) starting from Bulgan, a sub-district in Khovd Province in the west and ending at Sainshand, the capital of Dornogovi Province. Human habitation along the route is rare, only that of nomads living in igloo-type huts called "gar". They were very courteous and happy to see so many people at one time. They even supplied cheese and milk to Kadethankar, who as a vegetarian, was surviving on Mongolian noodles and pastas.

During the trek, Kadethankar faced many hardships and one such hardship was her suffering from an attack of flu for a few days. On this occasion she covered herself with layers of sweaters. Another incident was a kick by the camel which was carrying her baggage. During the trek, there was also a sand storm which lasted for 3 days. On one occasion a camel carrying food had bolted but was finally brought back. There was even a rain storm on one day. But none of these hazards interrupted her determination to complete the trek. The weather conditions, all through the trek, was one of hot searing sun with average day temperature soaring to 47 °C (117 °F) and then dropping to 20 °C (68 °F) in the night, with severe arid conditions. This created a serious situation in which six of the 13 member team had to discontinue the trek. But Kadethankar carried on and was one of the seven members, the only woman from India apart two women from Australia and Singapore, who completed the trek in 51 days, nine days ahead of the scheduled period of 60 days.

== Awards and medals ==
India Today has honored her as one of the 35 young achievers. She has also received the Hirakani Award. Her name finds a place in the Limca Book of Records. She was awarded for the Bajaj Allianze Most Inspirational Working Woman award. She is the recipient of the Hirakani Award for her inspiring work as a woman, and also "The TiE Aspire India Young Achiever Award 2011". She has also won the Rotary Leadership Training program for district 3131 of Pune.

== See also ==
- Desert exploration
- List of firsts in India
