= Cambridge Judge Business School =

Business school of the University of Cambridge

University of Cambridge Judge Business School
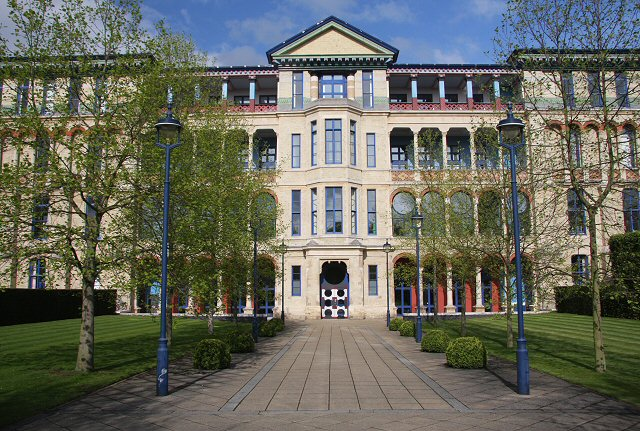
- Other name: CJBS
- Former names: Judge Institute of Management Studies (1990–2005); Judge Business School (2005–2010)
- Type: Business school
- Established: 1990
- Parent institution: University of Cambridge
- Accreditation: EQUIS
- Dean: Gishan Dissanaike
- Academic staff: 80
- Students: ≈900
- Location: Old Addenbrooke's Site, Trumpington Street, Cambridge, England; 52.200224°N 0.121461°E
- Campus: Urban
- Website: www.jbs.cam.ac.uk

The University of Cambridge Judge Business School (CJBS) is the business school within the School of Technology at the University of Cambridge in Cambridge, England, United Kingdom. The school was established in 1990 and carries out education and research in management and business-related disciplines.

== History ==
=== Founding and Early Years ===
The business school was established in 1990 as the Judge Institute for Management Studies, named after Paul Judge, a founding benefactor of the school. In 1991, donations from Sir Paul and Lady Judge, together with the Monument Trust, provided the funds for the construction of a building for the newly formed Business School.

Architect John Outram was appointed to the project, which was completed in August 1995 and officially opened by Queen Elizabeth II. Before the business school's founding, management studies had been taught at the university since 1954.

=== Name changes ===
In September 2005, the Judge Institute of Management Studies was renamed as the Judge Business School. In 2010, the Business School adopted the name Cambridge Judge Business School, University of Cambridge, reflecting its institutional association with the University of Cambridge, as a department of the University's School of Technology.

Benefactor Paul Judge died in 2017.

== Architecture / Campus & Facilities ==
Cambridge Judge Business School, University of Cambridge, is located on the Old Addenbrooke's Hospital site on Trumpington Street in central Cambridge, near the Fitzwilliam Museum.

The business school sits within the Silicon Fen area of Cambridge, hosting an entrepreneurship accelerator, Accelerate Cambridge, and has links with Cambridge Enterprise, the commercialisation and innovation arm of the University of Cambridge.

The original hospital buildings were converted for use by the Business School by architect John Outram. The project involved adapting the listed ward blocks and arcades of the former hospital for academic use. The Ark, The Castle and The Gallery buildings were also added. In 2018, an additional adjacent building, the Simon Sainsbury Centre, was opened to provide further teaching and executive education facilities.

== Programmes ==
Cambridge Judge Business School, University of Cambridge, offers a range of postgraduate, doctoral and executive education programmes in management and business-related disciplines. Its academic provision is structured across MBA programmes, masters degrees, doctoral study, entrepreneurship programmes and executive education.

=== MBA ===
The Business School offers a full-time Master of Business Administration (MBA) and Executive MBA programmes. These degree programmes provide postgraduate education in management for students and professionals with prior work experience.

=== Masters Programmes ===
Cambridge Judge Business School, University of Cambridge, offers a portfolio of master's-level degrees across subject areas such as general management and leadership, accounting, finance, entrepreneurship, technology policy, and social innovation. These are intended for students seeking advanced academic study in business-related fields.

=== Doctoral Programmes ===
The Business School supports doctoral study and academic research in management and related disciplines, contributing to the University of Cambridge's wider research activity. Doctoral provision includes PhD programmes as well as research-oriented masters degrees, such as MPhil and MRes programmes, which support advanced study in areas including management, strategy, organisation and finance.

In addition, the Business School offers a research-based business doctorate (BusD) designed for experienced professionals, alongside its academic doctoral pathway.

=== Executive Education & Custom Programmes ===
In addition to degree programmes, the Business School delivers executive education, comprising non-degree programmes for experienced professionals and organisations. These include open-enrolment and custom programmes designed for organisations, covering a range of management and leadership topics.

Business school rankings

Europe
- QS MBA: 1
- Financial Times MBA: 8

Global
- QS MBA: 5
- Financial Times MBA: 17
- THE Business: 6

In 2024, the Business School's Executive Education department achieved B Corp certification.

=== Business School Rankings ===
Cambridge Judge Business School, University of Cambridge, is accredited by EQUIS (European Quality Improvement System), an international accreditation system for business schools administered by the European Foundation for Management Development (EFMD).

== Research centres ==
Cambridge Judge Business School, University of Cambridge, undertakes research that is organised around 8 subject groups: accounting, economics and policy, finance, marketing, operations and technology management, organisational behaviour, organisational theory and information systems, and strategy and international business. Activity is organised through interdisciplinary research centres and institutes.

The Business School's research spans areas including financial systems, behavioural economics, innovation and entrepreneurship, organisational behaviour, leadership and public policy. Research activity includes work in areas such as alternative finance, financial reporting and accountability, risk studies and social innovation.

Some centres, including the Cambridge Centre for Alternative Finance and the El-Erian Institute of Behavioural Economics and Policy, have attracted wider academic, regulatory and policy interest for their research contributions.

Alongside these established areas, recent research activity has included work related to topics such as climate policy, governance and artificial intelligence, reflecting the interdisciplinary nature of the School's research framework.

=== Research Excellence Framework ===
In the most recent Research Excellence Framework conducted in 2021, Cambridge Judge Business School, University of Cambridge, was ranked first in the UK for business and management studies.

== Directors of the School (Deans) ==
Cambridge Judge Business School, University of Cambridge, is led by a Dean, who is responsible for the academic and strategic direction of the business school.

Gishan Dissanaike has served as Dean since 2024.

- Stephen Watson, 1990–1994.
- Dame Sandra Dawson, 1995–2006.
- Arnoud De Meyer, 2006 – August 2010.
- Geoff Meeks, Acting Director, September 2010 – August 2011.
- Christoph Loch, 2011–2021.
- Mauro Guillén September 2021 to June 2023.
- Gishan Dissanaike Interim Dean, July 2023 – November 2024; Dean from December 2024.

== Notable alumni ==
- Diezani Alison-Madueke, politician and former President of OPEC.
- Ben Barry, author and entrepreneur.
- Semaan Bassil, Chairman & General Manager of Byblos Bank S.A.L.
- Alison Brittain, CEO of Whitbread, former head of Lloyds Banking Group.
- Badr Jafar, CEO of Crescent Enterprises.
- Sacha McMeeking, New Zealand academic, lawyer and activist.
- Maggie O'Carroll, co-founder of The Women's Organisation.
- Ollie Phillips, former Captain of England Sevens and '7s World Rugby Player of the Year'.
- Tom Ransley, British rower and Olympic gold medalist.
- Eben Upton, co-founder of the Raspberry Pi Foundation.
- Zhang Zetian, chief fashion adviser at JD.com.
- Chuah Joon Huang, President and CEO of Southern University College.

== Notable Faculty ==
- Dame Sandra Dawson, KPMG Professor of Management Studies from 1995 to 2013, and Director of the Business School from 1995 to 2006, Fellow and former Master of Sidney Sussex College.
- Mark de Rond, Professor of Organisational Ethnography, Fellow of Darwin College.
- Gishan Dissanaike, Adam Smith Professor of Corporate Governance, Fellow of Hughes Hall College.
- Christoph Loch, Professor of Management Studies and former Director of the Business School (2011 to 2021), Fellow of Pembroke College.
- Sucheta Nadkarni (1967-2019), until October 2019, Sinyi Professor of Chinese Management, Fellow of Newnham College.
- Jaideep Prabhu, Nehru Professor of Indian Enterprise, Fellow of Clare College.
- Raghavendra Rau, Sir Evelyn de Rothschild Professor of Finance, Co-Founder and Academic Director of the Cambridge Centre for Alternative Finance (CCAF).
- Thomas Roulet, Professor of Organisational Sociology and Leadership, Fellow and Director of Studies in Psychology & Behavioural Science at King's College.
