= Disruptive innovation =

Technological change

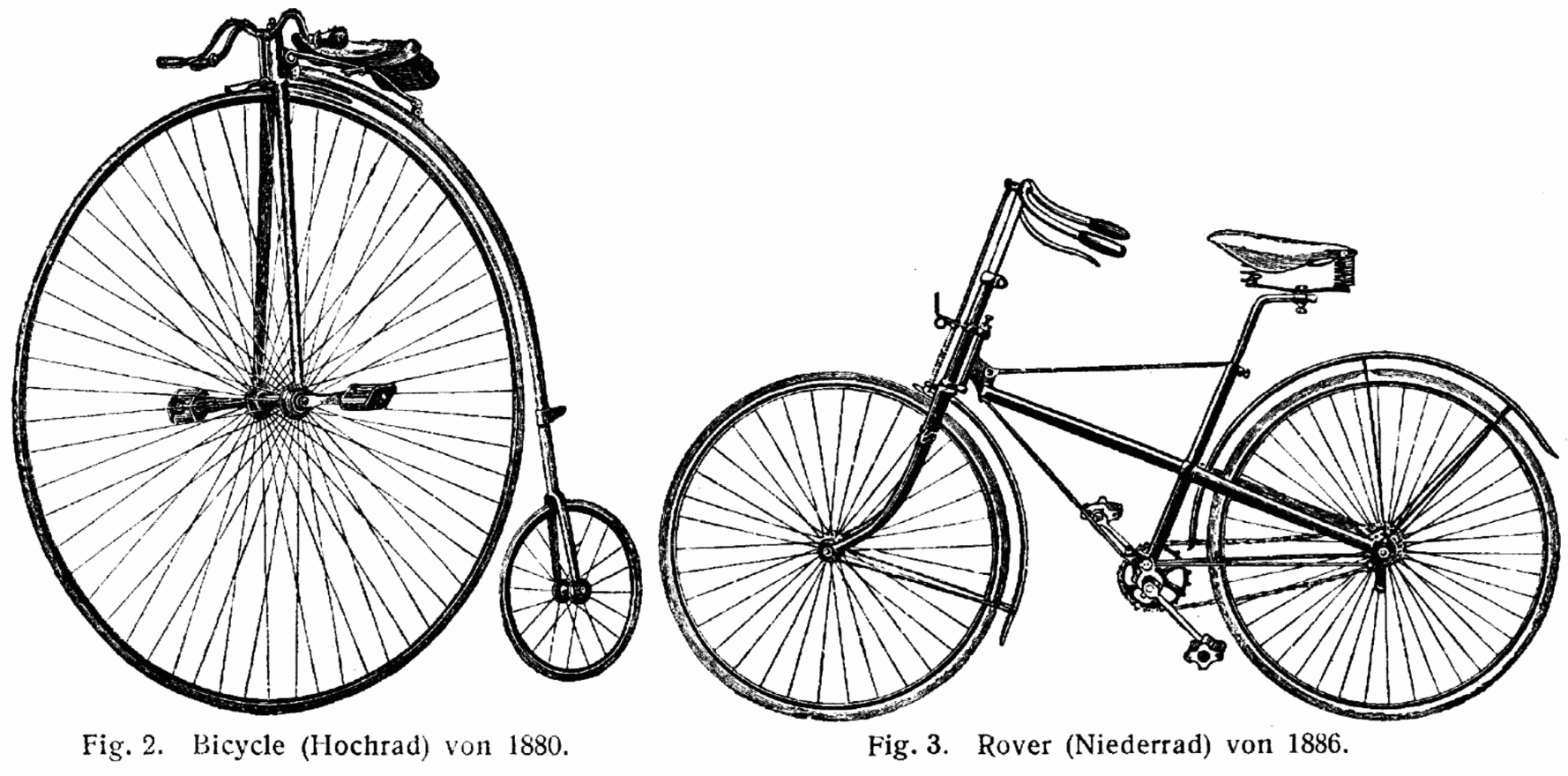
An 1880 penny-farthing (left), and an 1886 Rover safety bicycle with gearing

In business theory, disruptive innovation is innovation that creates a new market and value network or enters at the bottom of an existing market and eventually displaces incumbent firms, products, and alliances. In theory, disruptive innovation makes it hard for leading firms to stay at the top of their industry. The term, "disruptive innovation" was popularized by the American academic Clayton Christensen and his collaborators beginning in 1995.

Not all innovations are disruptive, even if they are revolutionary. For example, the first automobiles in the late 19th century were not a disruptive innovation, because early automobiles were expensive luxury items that did not disrupt the market for horse-drawn vehicles. However, the mass-produced automobile was a disruptive innovation, because it changed the transportation market, whereas the first thirty years of automobiles did not.

Disruptive innovations tend to be produced by outsiders and entrepreneurs in startups, rather than existing market-leading companies. The business environment of market leaders does not allow them to pursue disruptive innovations when they first arise, because they are not profitable enough at first and because their development can take scarce resources away from sustaining innovations (which are needed to compete against current competition). Small teams are more likely to create disruptive innovations than large teams. A disruptive process can take longer to develop than by the conventional approach and the risk associated with it is higher than the other more incremental, architectural or evolutionary forms of innovations, but once it is deployed in the market, it achieves a much faster penetration and higher degree of impact on the established markets.

== Usage history ==
Christensen's types of innovation

Sustaining
An innovation that does not significantly affect existing markets. It may be either:

Evolutionary
An innovation that improves a product in an existing market in ways that customers are expecting (e.g., fuel injection for gasoline engines, which displaced carburetors.)
Revolutionary (discontinuous but sustaining)
An innovation that is unexpected, but nevertheless does not affect existing markets (e.g., the first automobiles in the late 19th century, which were expensive luxury items, and as such very few were sold and did not displace any existing product or service.)

Disruptive
An innovation that creates a new market or enters at the bottom of an existing market by providing a different set of values, which ultimately (and unexpectedly) overtakes incumbents (e.g., the lower-priced, affordable Ford Model T, which displaced horse-drawn carriages)

The term disruptive technologies was coined by Clayton M. Christensen and introduced in his 1995 article Disruptive Technologies: Catching the Wave, which he cowrote with Joseph Bower. Similar ideas had previously been described in Richard N. Foster's book Innovation: The Attacker's Advantage and in the paper "Strategic responses to technological threats", as well as by Joseph Schumpeter in the book Capitalism, Socialism and Democracy (as creative destruction).

The article is aimed at both management executives who make the funding or purchasing decisions in companies, as well as the research community, which is largely responsible for introducing the disruptive vector to the consumer market. He describes the term further in his book The Innovator's Dilemma. Innovator's Dilemma explored the case of the disk drive industry (the disk drive and memory industry, with its rapid technological evolution, is to the study of technology what fruit flies are to the study of genetics, as Christensen was told in the 1990s) and the excavating and Earth-moving industry (where hydraulic actuation slowly, yet eventually, displaced cable-actuated machinery). In his sequel with Michael E. Raynor, The Innovator's Solution, Christensen replaced the term disruptive technology with disruptive innovation because he recognized that most technologies are not intrinsically disruptive or sustaining in character; rather, it is the business model that identifies the crucial idea that potentiates profound market success and subsequently serves as the disruptive vector. Comprehending Christensen's business model, which takes the disruptive vector from the idea borne from the mind of the innovator to a marketable product, is central to understanding how novel technology facilitates the rapid destruction of established technologies and markets by the disruptor. Christensen and Mark W. Johnson, who cofounded the management consulting firm Innosight, described the dynamics of "business model innovation" in the 2008 Harvard Business Review article "Reinventing Your Business Model". The concept of disruptive technology continues a long tradition of identifying radical technological change in the study of innovation by economists, and its implementation and execution by its management at a corporate or policy level.

According to Christensen, "the term 'disruptive innovation' is misleading when it is used to refer to the derivative, or 'instantaneous value', of the market behavior of the product or service, rather than the integral, or 'sum over histories', of the product's market behavior."

In the late 1990s, the automotive sector began to embrace a perspective of "constructive disruptive technology" by working with the consultant David E. O'Ryan, whereby the use of current off-the-shelf technology was integrated with newer innovation to create what he called "an unfair advantage". The process or technology change as a whole had to be "constructive" in improving the current method of manufacturing, yet disruptively impact the whole of the business case model, resulting in a significant reduction of waste, energy, materials, labor, or legacy costs to the user.

In keeping with the insight that a persuasive advertising campaign can be just as effective as technological sophistication at bringing a successful product to market, Christensen's theory explains why many disruptive innovations are not advanced or useful technologies, rather combinations of existing off-the-shelf components, applied shrewdly to a fledgling value network.

Online news site TechRepublic proposes an end using the term, and similar related terms, suggesting that, as of 2014, it is overused jargon.

=== Definition ===
- Disruption is a process, not a product or service, that occurs from the nascent to the mainstream
- Originates in low-end (less demanding customers) or new market (where none existed) footholds
- New firms do not catch on with mainstream customers until quality catches up with their standards
- Success is not a requirement and some business can be disruptive but fail
- New firm's business model differs significantly from incumbent

Christensen continues to develop and refine the theory and has accepted that not all examples of disruptive innovation perfectly fit into his theory. For example, he conceded that originating in the low end of the market is not always a cause of disruptive innovation, but rather it fosters competitive business models, using Uber as an example. In an interview with Forbes magazine he stated:

Uber helped me realize that it isn't that being at the bottom of the market is the causal mechanism, but that it's correlated with a business model that is unattractive to its competitor.

Entrepreneur Chris Dixon cited the theory for the idea that "the next big thing always starts out being dismissed as a 'toy'".

== Theory ==
The current theoretical understanding of disruptive innovation is different from what might be expected by default, an idea that Clayton M. Christensen called the "technology mudslide hypothesis". This is the simplistic idea that an established firm fails because it doesn't "keep up technologically" with other firms. In this hypothesis, firms are like climbers scrambling upward on crumbling footing, where it takes constant upward-climbing effort just to stay still, and any break from the effort (such as complacency born of profitability) causes a rapid downhill slide. Christensen and colleagues have shown that this simplistic hypothesis is wrong; it doesn't model reality. What they have shown is that good firms are usually aware of the innovations, but their business environment does not allow them to pursue them when they first arise, because they are not profitable enough at first and because their development can take scarce resources away from that of sustaining innovations (which are needed to compete against current competition). In Christensen's terms, a firm's existing value networks place insufficient value on the disruptive innovation to allow its pursuit by that firm. Meanwhile, start-up firms inhabit different value networks, at least until the day that their disruptive innovation is able to invade the older value network. At that time, the established firm in that network can at best only fend off the market share attack with a me-too entry, for which survival (not thriving) is the only reward.

In the technology mudslide hypothesis, Christensen differentiated disruptive innovation from sustaining innovation, whose goal is to improve existing product performance. On the other hand, he defines a disruptive innovation as a product or service designed for a new set of customers.

Generally, disruptive innovations were technologically straightforward, consisting of off-the-shelf components put together in a product architecture that was often simpler than prior approaches. They offered less of what customers in established markets wanted and so could rarely be initially employed there. They offered a different package of attributes valued only in emerging markets remote from, and unimportant to, the mainstream.

Christensen also noted that products considered as disruptive innovations tend to skip stages in the traditional product design and development process to quickly gain market traction and competitive advantage. He argued that disruptive innovations can hurt successful, well-managed companies that are responsive to their customers and have excellent research and development. These companies tend to ignore the markets most susceptible to disruptive innovations, because the markets have very tight profit margins and are too small to provide a good growth rate to an established (sizable) firm. Thus, disruptive technology provides an example of an instance when the common business-world advice to "focus on the customer" (or "stay close to the customer", or "listen to the customer") can be strategically counterproductive.

While Christensen argued that disruptive innovations can hurt successful, well-managed companies, O'Ryan countered that "constructive" integration of existing, new, and forward-thinking innovation could improve the economic benefits of these same well-managed companies, once decision-making management understood the systemic benefits as a whole.

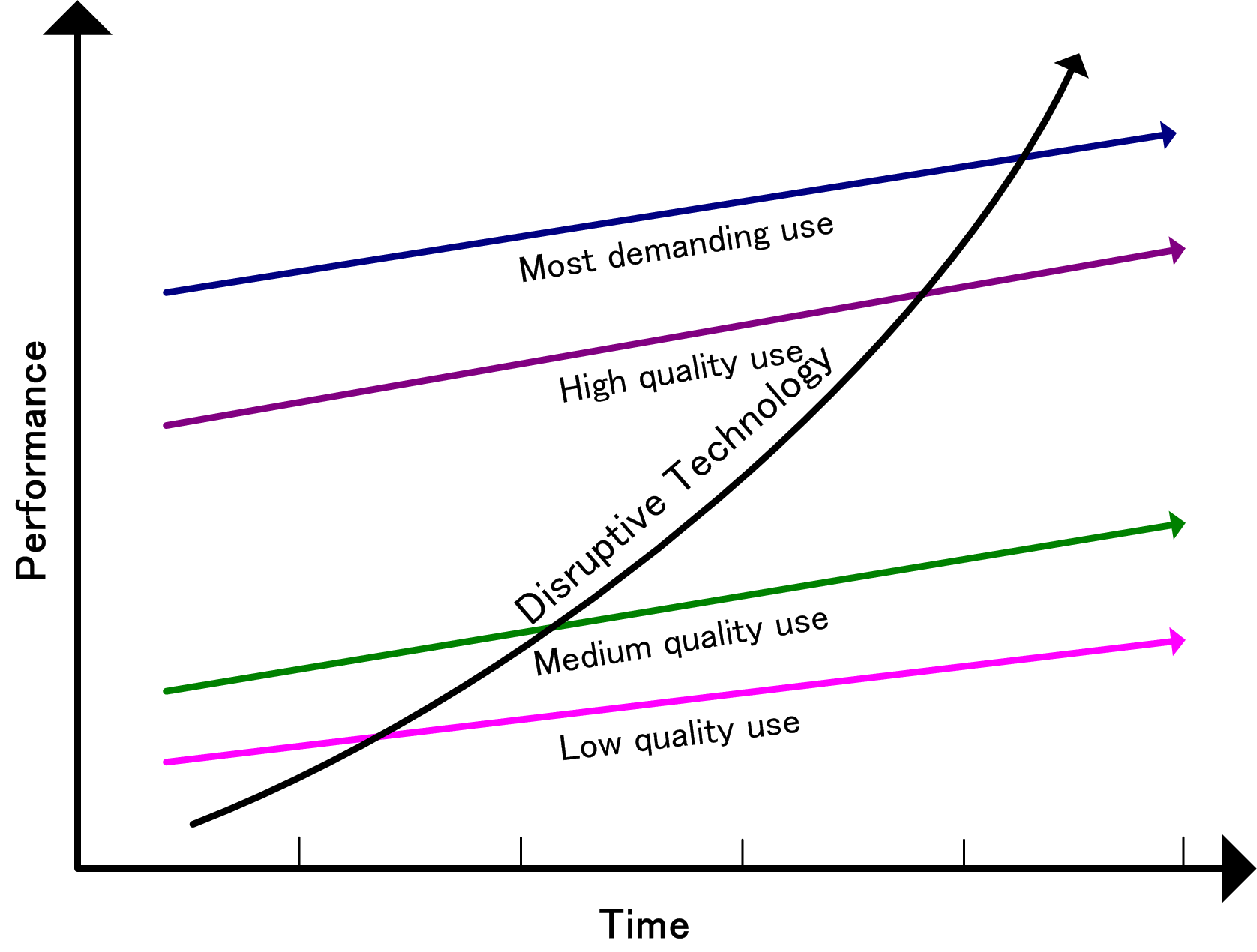
How low-end disruption occurs over time

Christensen distinguishes between "low-end disruption", which targets customers who do not need the full performance valued by customers at the high end of the market, and "new-market disruption", which targets customers who have needs that were previously unserved by existing incumbents.

=== Low-end disruption ===
"Low-end disruption" occurs when the rate at which products improve exceeds the rate at which customers can adopt the new performance. Therefore, at some point the performance of the product overshoots the needs of certain customer segments. At this point, a disruptive technology may enter the market and provide a product that has lower performance than the incumbent but that exceeds the requirements of certain segments, thereby gaining a foothold in the market.

In low-end disruption, the disruptor is focused initially on serving the least profitable customer, who is happy with a good enough product. This type of customer is not willing to pay premium for enhancements in product functionality. Once the disruptor has gained a foothold in this customer segment, it seeks to improve its profit margin. To get higher profit margins, the disruptor needs to enter the segment where the customer is willing to pay a little more for higher quality. To ensure this quality in its product, the disruptor needs to innovate. The incumbent will not do much to retain its share in a not-so-profitable segment, and will move up-market and focus on its more attractive customers. After a number of such encounters, the incumbent is squeezed into smaller markets than it was previously serving. And then, finally, the disruptive technology meets the demands of the most profitable segment and drives the established company out of the market.

=== New market disruption ===
"New market disruption" occurs when a product fits a new or emerging market segment that is not being served by existing incumbents in the industry. Some scholars note that the creation of a new market is a defining feature of disruptive innovation, particularly in the way it tends to improve products or services differently in comparison to normal market drivers. It initially caters to a niche market and proceeds on defining the industry over time once it is able to penetrate the market or induce consumers to defect from the existing market into the new market it created.

=== Social cost ===
W. Chan Kim and Renée Mauborgne, the authors of Blue Ocean Strategy, also published a book in 2023, Beyond Disruption, criticizing disruptive innovation for the layoffs and social costs it tends to incur.

==== Proactive approach ====
A proactive approach to addressing the challenge posed by disruptive innovations has been debated by scholars. Petzold criticized the lack of acknowledgment of underlying process of the change to study the disruptive innovation over time from a process view and complexify the concept to support the understanding of its unfolding and advance its manageability. Keeping in view the multidimensional nature of disruptive innovation a measurement framework has been developed by Guo to enable a systemic assessment of disruptive potential of innovations, providing insights for the decisions in product/service launch and resource allocation. Middle managers play an important role in long term sustainability of any firm and thus have been studied to have a proactive role in exploitation of the disruptive innovation process.

=== Criticism ===
The extrapolation of the theory to all aspects of life has been challenged, as has the methodology of relying on selected case studies as the principal form of evidence. Jill Lepore points out that some companies identified by the theory as victims of disruption a decade or more ago, rather than being defunct, remain dominant in their industries today (including Seagate Technology, U.S. Steel, and Bucyrus). Lepore questions whether the theory has been oversold and misapplied, as if it were able to explain everything in every sphere of life, including not just business but education and public institutions.

== Disruptive technology ==
In 2009, Milan Zeleny described high technology as disruptive technology and raised the question of what is being disrupted. The answer, according to Zeleny, is the support network of high technology. For example, introducing electric cars disrupts the support network for gasoline cars (network of gas and service stations). Such disruption is fully expected and therefore effectively resisted by support net owners. In the long run, high (disruptive) technology bypasses, upgrades, or replaces the outdated support network.

Questioning the concept of a disruptive technology, Haxell (2012) questions how such technologies get named and framed, pointing out that this is a positioned and retrospective act.

Technology, being a form of social relationship, always evolves. No technology remains fixed. Technology starts, develops, persists, mutates, stagnates, and declines, just like living organisms. The evolutionary life cycle occurs in the use and development of any technology. A new high-technology core emerges and challenges existing technology support nets (TSNs), which are thus forced to coevolve with it. New versions of the core are designed and fitted into an increasingly appropriate TSN, with smaller and smaller high-technology effects. High technology becomes regular technology, with more efficient versions fitting the same support net. Finally, even the efficiency gains diminish, emphasis shifts to product tertiary attributes (appearance, style), and technology becomes TSN-preserving appropriate technology. This technological equilibrium state becomes established and fixated, resisting being interrupted by a technological mutation; then new high technology appears and the cycle is repeated.

Regarding this evolving process of technology, Christensen said:

The technological changes that damage established companies are usually not radically new or difficult from a technological point of view. They do, however, have two important characteristics: First, they typically present a different package of performance attributes—ones that, at least at the outset, are not valued by existing customers. Second, the performance attributes that existing customers do value improve at such a rapid rate that the new technology can later invade those established markets.

The World Bank's 2019 World Development Report on The Changing Nature of Work examines how technology shapes the relative demand for certain skills in labor markets and expands the reach of firms - robotics and digital technologies, for example, enable firms to automate, replacing labor with machines to become more efficient, and innovate, expanding the number of tasks and products. Joseph Bower explained the process of how disruptive technology, through its requisite support net, dramatically transforms a certain industry.

When the technology that has the potential for revolutionizing an industry emerges, established companies typically see it as unattractive: it's not something their mainstream customers want, and its projected profit margins aren't sufficient to cover big-company cost structure. As a result, the new technology tends to get ignored in favor of what's currently popular with the best customers. But then another company steps in to bring the innovation to a new market. Once the disruptive technology becomes established there, smaller-scale innovation rapidly raise the technology's performance on attributes that mainstream customers' value.

For example, the automobile was high technology with respect to the horse carriage. It evolved into technology and finally into appropriate technology with a stable, unchanging TSN. The main high-technology advance in the offing is some form of electric car—whether the energy source is the sun, hydrogen, water, air pressure, or traditional charging outlet. Electric cars preceded the gasoline automobile by many decades and are now returning to replace the traditional gasoline automobile. The printing press was a development that changed the way that information was stored, transmitted, and replicated. This allowed empowered authors but it also promoted censorship and information overload in writing technology.

Milan Zeleny described the above phenomenon. He also wrote that:

Implementing high technology is often resisted. This resistance is well understood on the part of active participants in the requisite TSN. The electric car will be resisted by gas-station operators in the same way automated teller machines (ATMs) were resisted by bank tellers and automobiles by horsewhip makers. Technology does not qualitatively restructure the TSN and therefore will not be resisted and never has been resisted. Middle management resists business process reengineering because BPR represents a direct assault on the support net (coordinative hierarchy) they thrive on. Teamwork and multi-functionality is resisted by those whose TSN provides the comfort of narrow specialization and command-driven work.

Social media could be considered a disruptive innovation within sports. More specifically, the way that news in sports circulates nowadays versus the pre-internet era where sports news was mainly on TV, radio and newspapers. Social media has created a new market for sports that was not around before in the sense that players and fans have instant access to information related to sports.

Disruptiveness of research articles can be estimated with CD index.

== High-technology effects ==
High technology is a technology core that changes the very architecture (structure and organization) of the components of the technology support net. High technology therefore transforms the qualitative nature of the TSN's tasks and their relations, as well as their requisite physical, energy, and information flows. It also affects the skills required, the roles played, and the styles of management and coordination—the organizational culture itself.

This kind of technology core is different from regular technology core, which preserves the qualitative nature of flows and the structure of the support and only allows users to perform the same tasks in the same way, but faster, more reliably, in larger quantities, or more efficiently. It is also different from appropriate technology core, which preserves the TSN itself with the purpose of technology implementation and allows users to do the same thing in the same way at comparable levels of efficiency, instead of improving the efficiency of performance.

On differences between high and low technologies, Milan Zeleny wrote:

The effects of high technology always breaks the direct comparability by changing the system itself, therefore requiring new measures and new assessments of its productivity. High technology cannot be compared and evaluated with the existing technology purely on the basis of cost, net present value or return on investment. Only within an unchanging and relatively stable TSN would such direct financial comparability be meaningful. For example, you can directly compare a manual typewriter with an electric typewriter, but not a typewriter with a word processor. Therein lies the management challenge of high technology.

Not all modern technologies are high technologies, only those used and functioning as such, and embedded in their requisite TSNs. They have to empower the individual because only through the individual can they empower knowledge. Not all information technologies have integrative effects. Some information systems are still designed to improve the traditional hierarchy of command and thus preserve and entrench the existing TSN. The administrative model of management, for instance, further aggravates the division of task and labor, further specializes knowledge, separates management from workers, and concentrates information and knowledge in centers.

As knowledge surpasses capital, labor, and raw materials as the dominant economic resource, technologies are also starting to reflect this shift. Technologies are rapidly shifting from centralized hierarchies to distributed networks. Nowadays knowledge does not reside in a super-mind, super-book, or super-database, but in a complex relational pattern of networks brought forth to coordinate human action.

== Examples ==
In the practical world, the popularization of personal computers illustrates how knowledge contributes to the ongoing technology innovation. The original centralized concept (one computer, many persons) is a knowledge-defying idea of the prehistory of computing, and its inadequacies and failures have become clearly apparent. The era of personal computing brought powerful computers "on every desk" (one person, one computer). This short transitional period was necessary for getting used to the new computing environment, but was inadequate from the vantage point of producing knowledge. Adequate knowledge creation and management come mainly from networking and distributed computing (one person, many computers). Each person's computer must form an access point to the entire computing landscape or ecology through the Internet of other computers, databases, and mainframes, as well as production, distribution, and retailing facilities, and the like. For the first time, technology empowers individuals rather than external hierarchies. It transfers influence and power where it optimally belongs: at the loci of the useful knowledge. Even though hierarchies and bureaucracies do not innovate, free and empowered individuals do; knowledge, innovation, spontaneity, and self-reliance are becoming increasingly valued and promoted.

Uber is not an example of disruption because it did not originate in a low-end or new market footholds. One of the conditions for the business to be considered disruptive according to Clayton M. Christensen is that the business should originate on a) low-end or b) new-market footholds. Instead, Uber was launched in San Francisco, a large urban city with an established taxi service and did not target low-end customers or create a new market (from the consumer perspective). In contrast, UberSELECT, an option that provides luxurious cars such as limousines at a discounted price, is an example of disruption innovation because it originates from a low-end customer segment - customers who would not have entered the traditional luxurious market.

Category	Disruptive innovation	Market disrupted by innovation	Notes
Printed reference works	Wikipedia	Traditional encyclopedias	Traditional, for-profit general encyclopedias with articles written by paid experts have been displaced by Wikipedia, an online encyclopedia which is written and edited by volunteer editors. Former market leader Encyclopædia Britannica ended its print production after 244 years in 2012. Britannica's price of over $1000, its physical size of dozens of hard-bound volumes, its weight of over 100 pounds (45 kg), its number of articles (about 120,000) and its update cycles lasting a year or longer made it unable to compete with Wikipedia, which provides free, online access to over 6 million articles with most of them updated more frequently. Wikipedia not only disrupted printed paper encyclopedias; it also disrupted digital encyclopedias. Microsoft's Encarta, a 1993 entry into professionally edited digital encyclopedias, was once a major rival to Britannica but was discontinued in 2009. Wikipedia's free access, online accessibility on computers and smartphones, unlimited size and instant updates are some of the challenges faced by for-profit competition in the encyclopedia market.
Communication	Telephony	Telegraphy	When Western Union declined to purchase Alexander Graham Bell's telephone patents for $100,000, their highest-profit market was long-distance telegraphy. Telephones were only useful at that time for very local calls. Short-distance telegraphy barely existed as a market segment, which explains Western Union's decision to not enter the emerging telephone market. Telephones quickly displaced telegraphs by offering much greater communication capacity.
Communication	FM radio	AM radio	
Computer hardware	Minicomputers	Mainframes	Minicomputers were originally presented as an inexpensive alternative to mainframes and mainframe manufacturers did not consider them a serious threat in their market. Eventually, the market for minicomputers (led by Seymour Cray—daisy chaining his minisupercomputers) became much larger than the market for mainframes.
Computer hardware	Personal computers	Minicomputers, workstations, word processors, Lisp machines	Personal computers combined all functions into one device.
Computer hardware	Pocket calculator	3.5 standard calculator	Equivalent computing performance and portable
Computer hardware	Digital calculator	Mechanical calculator	Facit AB used to dominate the European market for calculators, but did not adopt digital technology, and failed to compete with digital competitors.
Computer hardware	Mobile phones	Car phones and MP3 players	The inherent portability of mobile phones and eventual Bluetooth integration into cars and mobile phones rendered the need for a separate car phone moot. A similar situation occurred once mobile phones gained the ability to play and store a significant number of MP3 files.
Computer hardware	Smartphones	All prior types of rudimentary feature phones and PDAs	Smartphones were both a revolutionary (in the mobile phone industry) and disruptive innovation (displacing PDAs) as they were: generally more capable than earlier types of mobile phones, introduced and popularized entirely new services/markets that were exclusive to smartphones, had a secondary function as a PDA, and could leverage existing cellular data services and increased computing power to connect to and use the internet to a greater extent than that of a typical PDA (which were usually reliant on Wi-Fi and retained limited computing power).
Data storage	8 inch floppy disk drive	14 inch hard disk drive	The floppy disk drive market has had unusually large changes in market share over the past fifty years. According to Clayton M. Christensen's research, the cause of this instability was a repeating pattern of disruptive innovations. For example, in 1981, the old 8 inch drives (used in mini computers) were "vastly superior" to the new 5.25 inch drives (used in desktop computers). The 8 inch drives were not affordable for new desktop machines. The simple 5.25 inch drive, assembled from technologically inferior "off-the-shelf" components, was an "innovation" only in the sense that it was new. However, as this market grew and the drives improved, the companies that manufactured them eventually triumphed while many of the existing manufacturers of 8 inch drives fell behind.
Data storage	5.25 inch floppy disk	8 inch floppy disk	
Data storage	3.5 inch floppy disk	5.25 inch floppy disk	
Data storage	Optical discs and USB flash drives	Bernoulli drive and Zip drive	
Display	Light-emitting diodes	Light bulbs	An LED is significantly smaller and less power-consuming than a light bulb. The first optical LEDs were weak, and only useful as indicator lights, in particular since they could only produce red and orange light until the invention of blue LEDs in the 1990s. Later models could be used for indoor lighting, and now several cities are switching to LED street lights. Incandescent light bulbs are being banned in many countries. LED displays and AMOLED are also becoming competitive with LCDs.
Display	LCD	CRT	The first liquid-crystal displays (LCDs) were monochromatic and had low resolution. They were used in watches and other handheld devices, but during the early 2000s these (and other planar technologies) largely replaced the dominant cathode-ray tube (CRT) technology for computer displays and television sets. CRT sets are very heavy, and the size and weight of the tube limit the maximum screen size to about 38 inches; in contrast, LCD and other flat-panel TVs are available in 40", 50", 60" and even bigger sizes, all of which weigh much less than a CRT set. CRT technologies did improve in the late 1990s with advances like true-flat panels and digital controls; these updates were not enough to prevent CRTs from being displaced by flat-panel LCD displays.
Electronics	Transistor	Vacuum tube	Vacuum tubes were the dominant electronic technology up until the 1950s. The first transistor was invented by Bell Labs in 1947, but was initially overlooked by radio companies such as RCA up until the mid-1950s, when Sony successfully commercialized the technology with the pocket transistor radio, leading to transistors replacing vacuum tubes as the dominant electronic technology by the late 1950s.
Electronics	Silicon	Germanium	Up until the late 1950s, germanium was the dominant semiconductor material for semiconductor devices, as it was capable of the highest performance up until then.
Electronics	MOSFET	Bipolar junction transistor	The bipolar junction transistor (BJT) was the dominant semiconductor device up until the 1960s. In the 1970s, the MOSFET eventually replaced the BJT as the dominant semiconductor technology.
Manufacturing	Hydraulic excavators	Cable-operated excavators	Hydraulic excavators were clearly innovative at the time of introduction but they gained widespread use only decades after. Cable-operated excavators are still used in some cases, mainly for large excavations.
Manufacturing	Mini steel mills	Vertically integrated steel mills	By using mostly locally available scrap and power sources these mills can be cost effective even though not large.
Manufacturing	Plastic	Metal, wood, glass etc.	Bakelite and other early plastics had very limited use – their main advantages were electric insulation and low cost. New forms of plastic had advantages such as transparency, elasticity and combustibility. In the early 21st century, plastics can be used for many household items previously made of metal, wood and glass.
Music and video	Phonograph	Player piano	
Music and video	Downloadable digital media	CDs, DVDs	In the 1990s, the music industry phased out the vinyl record single, leaving consumers with no means to purchase individual songs. This market was initially filled by illegal peer-to-peer file sharing technologies, and then by online retailers such as the iTunes Store and Amazon.com. This low end disruption eventually undermined the sales of physical, high-cost recordings such as records, tapes and CDs.
Music and video	Streaming video	Video rental	Video on demand software can run on many Internet-enabled devices. Since licensing deals between film studios and streaming providers have become standard, this has obviated the need for people to seek rentals at physically separate locations. Netflix, a dominant company in this market, was cited as a significant threat to video stores when it first expanded beyond DVD by mail offerings. The Netflix co-founders approached rental chain Blockbuster LLC in 2000 trying to sell their company. Blockbuster declined and ultimately ceased operation ten years later.
Photography	Digital photography	Chemical photography	Early digital cameras suffered from low picture quality and resolution and long shutter lag. Quality and resolution are no longer major issues in the 2010s and shutter lag issues have been largely resolved. The convenience of small memory cards and portable hard drives that hold hundreds or thousands of pictures, as well as the lack of the need to develop these pictures, also helped make digital cameras the market leader. Digital cameras have a high power consumption (but several lightweight battery packs can provide enough power for thousands of pictures). Cameras for classic photography are stand-alone devices. In the same manner, high-resolution digital video recording has replaced film stock, except for high-budget motion pictures and fine art. The rise of digital cameras led Eastman Kodak, one of the largest camera companies for decades, to declare bankruptcy in 2012. Despite inventing one of the first digital cameras in 1975, Kodak remained invested in traditional film until much later.
Photography	High speed CMOS image sensors	Photographic film	When first introduced, high speed CMOS sensors were less sensitive, had lower resolution, and cameras based on them had less duration (record time). The advantage of rapid setup time, editing in the camera, and nearly-instantaneous review quickly eliminated 16 mm high speed film systems. CMOS-based digital cameras also require less power (single phase 110 V AC and a few amps for high-performance CMOS, direct current 5 V or 3.3 V and two or three amps for low-power CMOS, vs. 240 V single- or three-phase at 20–50 A for film cameras). Continuing advances have overtaken 35 mm film and are challenging 70 mm film applications.
Printing	Computer printers	Offset printing	Offset printing has a high overhead cost, but very low unit cost compared to computer printers, and superior quality. But as printers, especially laser printers, have improved in speed and quality, they have become increasingly useful for creating documents in limited issues.
Printing	Desktop publishing	Traditional publishing	Early desktop-publishing systems could not match high-end professional systems in either features or quality, but their impact was felt immediately as they lowered the cost of entry to the publishing business. By the mid-1990s, DTP had largely replaced traditional tools in most prepress operations.
Printing	Word processing	Typewriter	The typewriter has been replaced with word processing software that has a wealth of functionality to stylize, copy and facilitate document production.
Transportation	Steamboats	Sailing ships	The first steamships were deployed on inland waters where sailing ships were less effective, instead of on the higher profit margin seagoing routes. Hence steamships originally only competed in traditional shipping lines' "worst" markets.
Transportation	Safety bicycles	Penny-farthings	Penny farthings were popular in the 1870s but rendered obsolete by safety bicycles.
Transportation	Rail transport	Canals, Horse-drawn vehicles	The introduction of rail transport completely destroyed horse-drawn transport especially for long distances and also freight transport by canal was nearly wiped out. Rail transport led to the introduction of the joint-stock company, railway time and ultimately time zones and also opened up new markets for wider fresh produce and perishable goods distribution. In communications, newspapers and postal services were able to offer daily services over long-distances.
Transportation	Pipelines	rail transport	The Tide Water Pipe Company in 1879 built the first long distance oil pipeline (100 miles) in Pennsylvania
Transportation	Automobiles, mass automobility	Horse-drawn vehicles, rail transport, trams, walking	At the beginning of the 20th century, rail (including streetcars) was the fastest and most cost-efficient means of land transportation for goods and passengers in industrialized countries. The first cars, buses and trucks were used for local transportation in suburban areas, where they often replaced streetcars and industrial tracks. As highways expanded, medium- and later long-distance transports were relocated to road traffic, and some railways closed down. As rail traffic has a lower ton-kilometer cost, but a higher investment and operating cost than road traffic, rail is still preferred for large-scale bulk cargo (such as minerals). Traffic congestion provides a bound on the efficiency of car use, so rail is still used for urban passenger transport.
Transportation	High speed rail	Short-distance flights	In almost every market where high speed rail with journey times of two hours or less was introduced in competition with an air service, the air service was either greatly reduced within a few years or ceased entirely. Even in markets with longer rail travel times, airlines have reduced the number of flights on offer and passenger numbers have gone down. Examples include the Madrid–Barcelona high-speed rail line, the Cologne–Frankfurt high-speed rail line (where no direct flights are available as of 2016) or the Paris–London connection after the opening of High Speed 1. For medium-distance trips, like between Beijing and Shanghai, the high speed rail and airlines often end up in extremely stiff competition.
Transportation	Private jet	Supersonic transport	The Concorde aircraft has so far been the only supersonic airliner in extensive commercial traffic. It catered to a small customer segment, which could later afford small private sub-sonic jets. The loss of speed was compensated by flexibility and a more direct routing (i.e. no need to go through a hub). Supersonic flight is also banned above inhabited land, due to sonic booms. Concorde service ended in 2003.
Mining	Frasch process	traditional mining methods	The United States in the beginning of the 20th century was producing 1% of the world's sulphur. In 1929 it produced 85%.

== See also ==
- Artificial intelligence – Intelligence in machines
- Blue Ocean Strategy – Marketing theory book
- Breakthrough Initiatives – Science-based program founded in 2015
- Creative destruction – Concept in economics
- Creative disruption
- Culture lag – Phenomenon in culture and technology
- Digital revolution – Industrial shift to information technology
- Embrace, extend, extinguish – Anti-competitive business strategy
- Frugal innovation – Process of reducing the complexity and cost of a good and its production
- Hype cycle – Graphical presentation of the maturity of specific technologies
- Killer application – Software term
- Leapfrogging – Concept of fast advancement
- List of emerging technologies – New technologies actively in development
- Obsolescence – State of being obsolete
- Obsolete occupations - Jobs that have become obsolete, such as elevator operators
- Open innovation – Term for external cooperation in innovation
- Pace of innovation – Speed at which technological advancement is occurring
- Paradigm shift – Fundamental change in ideas and practices within a scientific discipline
- Product lifecycle – Duration of processing of products
- Robotic process automation – Form of business process automation technology
- Social contract – Concept in political philosophy
- Shock doctrine – 2007 non-fiction book by Naomi Klein
- Shock therapy (economics) – Sudden release of price and currency controls
- Stranded asset – Former physical asset, now a liability
- Technology readiness level – Method for estimating the maturity of technologies (NASA)
- Technology strategy – Strategy of technology use
