= INSEAD =

International business school

Coordinates: 48.4054°N 2.6853°E

- Institut européen d'administration des affaires
- Motto: The Business School for the World
- Type: Grande école de commerce et de management (private research university business school)
- Established: 1957; 69 years ago
- Academic affiliations: Sorbonne University, Conférence des Grandes Écoles
- Endowment: €400 million
- Chairman: Kristin Skogen Lund
- Dean: Francisco Veloso
- Faculty: 250+ 98% PhD.; 22% female; 91% international
- Students: ~1,540 (~1,000 in MBA) (~300 in EMBA) (~202 in MIM) (~50 in MFin) (~86 in Ph.D.)
- Location: Fontainebleau; Singapore; Abu Dhabi; San Francisco
- Language: English
- Website: insead.edu

INSEAD (/ˈɪnsiɑːd/ IN-see-ad; French: Institut européen d'administration des affaires, lit. 'European Institute of Business Administration') is a non-profit business school with locations in France (Fontainebleau), Singapore, the United Arab Emirates (Abu Dhabi), and the United States (San Francisco).

As a graduate-only business school, INSEAD offers a full-time Master of Business Administration, an Executive MBA (EMBA), an Executive Master in Finance, a Master in Management, an Executive Master in Change, a PhD in management, a Business Foundations post-graduate certificate and a variety of executive education programmes delivered at campuses in France, Singapore and Abu Dhabi.

== History ==
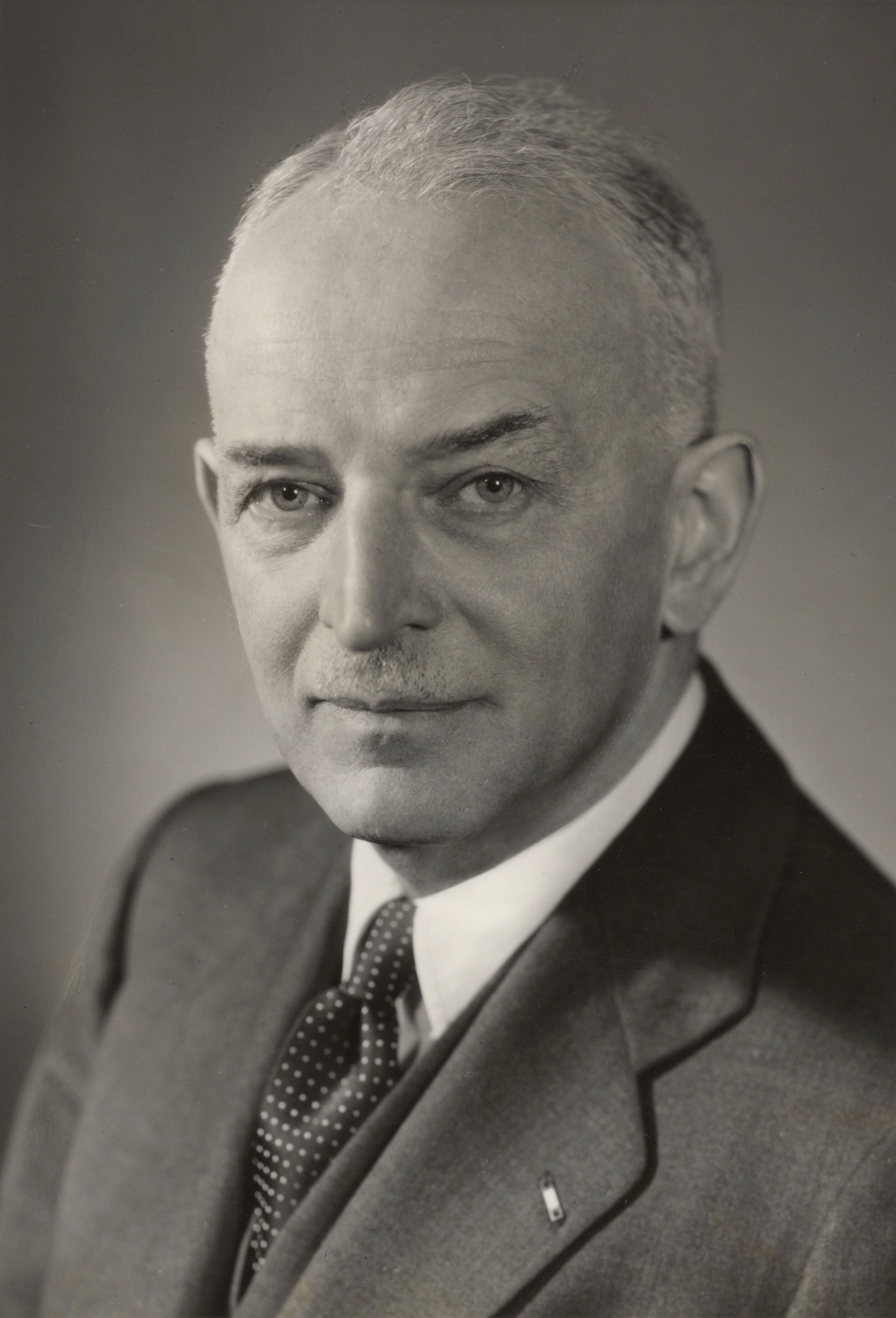
Georges Doriot, founder of INSEAD, potrait by Fabian Bachrach, Jr., circa 1962

INSEAD was founded in 1957 by venture capitalist Georges Doriot and his former students Claude Janssen, and Olivier Giscard d'Estaing. The original seed money was provided by the Paris Chamber of Commerce.

== Administration ==
=== Legal status ===
INSEAD operates as a non-profit association under French law with the purpose of promoting education of management. This legal status positions it as a private higher education institution, emphasizing its focus on management education without profit motives.

=== Affiliation ===
INSEAD is a founding member of Sorbonne Universities Association, created in 2012, and remain associated with the public multi-disciplinary research-based Sorbonne University, created in 2018 from the merger of some member institutions of association.

=== Campuses ===
INSEAD's founding campus (the Europe Campus) is located in Fontainebleau, near Paris, France. The second campus (the Asia Campus) is in the one-north district of Singapore next to one-north MRT station, and the third campus (the Middle East Campus) is located in Abu Dhabi. INSEAD expanded its presence to North America in 2020 with the opening of the INSEAD San Francisco Hub for Business Innovation.

The European and Asian campuses are considered to be equal in terms of status. Professors are rotated between campuses; so are students.

=== Grande école system ===
At its inception, INSEAD was not originally a grande école, a French system of institution of higher education that is separate from, but parallel and connected to, the main framework of the French public university system. However, the school joined the Conférence des Grandes Écoles in 2017.

Grandes écoles are academic institutions that admit students through a competitive process.

== Academics ==
=== Master programmes ===
==== Master in Management ====
Launched in May 2019, the INSEAD Master in Management (MIM) is a 14- to 16-month full-time programme for young graduates starting their careers in management. The average age of students on the INSEAD MIM is 23.

==== MBA ====
The programme is delivered across INSEAD campuses in Europe and Asia. It lasts 10 months, with two cohorts joining per year, in September and January.

==== Global Executive MBA ====
The institution runs a modular Global Executive MBA (GEMBA) programme across its Asia, Europe and Middle East campuses. It also offers the Tsinghua-INSEAD EMBA (TIEMBA) programme. Since 2024 it has offered the GEMBA Flex programme, a master's programme for executives.

=== PhD ===
The INSEAD PhD Programme is a five-year, full-time programme offered across the school's Asia and Europe Campuses, through which doctoral students contribute to the school's research while preparing for careers as management scholars and professors. Students specialise in one of the eight areas: accounting and control, decision sciences, entrepreneurship, finance, marketing, organisational behaviour, strategy or technology and operations management.

The programme is part of the INSEAD–Sorbonne University Alliance, which includes access to the Alliance’s Behavioural Lab in Paris and the possibility of a dual-degree PhD with Sorbonne University.

== Rankings and reputation ==
Business school rankings

Europe
- QS MBA: 4
- Financial Times MBA: 1

Global
- QS MBA: 8
- Financial Times MBA: 2

QS World Universities Rankings ranked INSEAD #2 globally in the Subject Ranking for Business and Management from 2018 to 2024.

The INSEAD MBA programme was ranked first globally by the Financial Times in 2016, 2017, and 2021, and has ranked among the top five in subsequent years, including #2 in 2026. The INSEAD MBA programme was ranked third globally by LinkedIn in 2025.

== Alumni ==
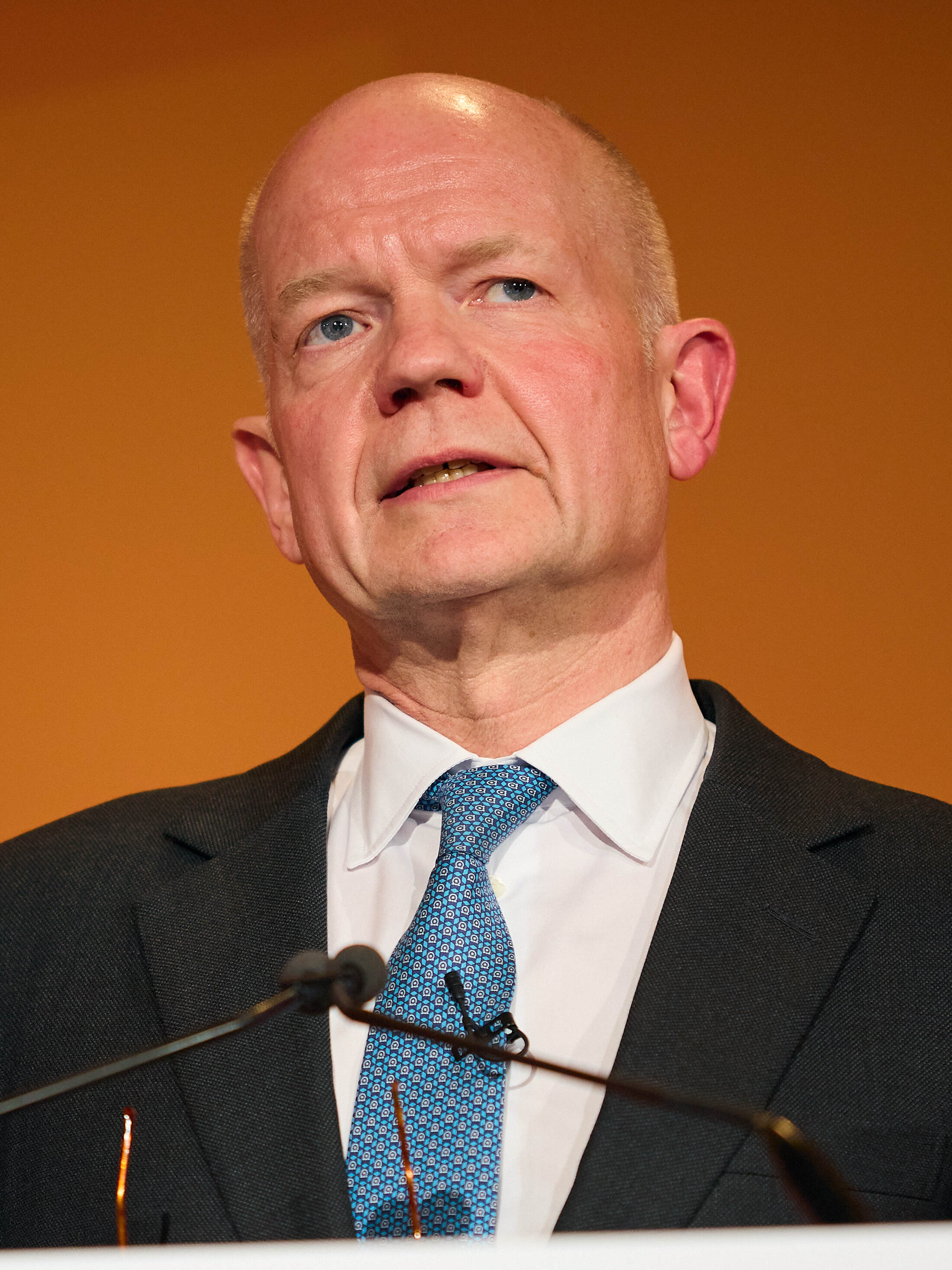
William Hague, MBA 1986, Chancellor of the University of Oxford.

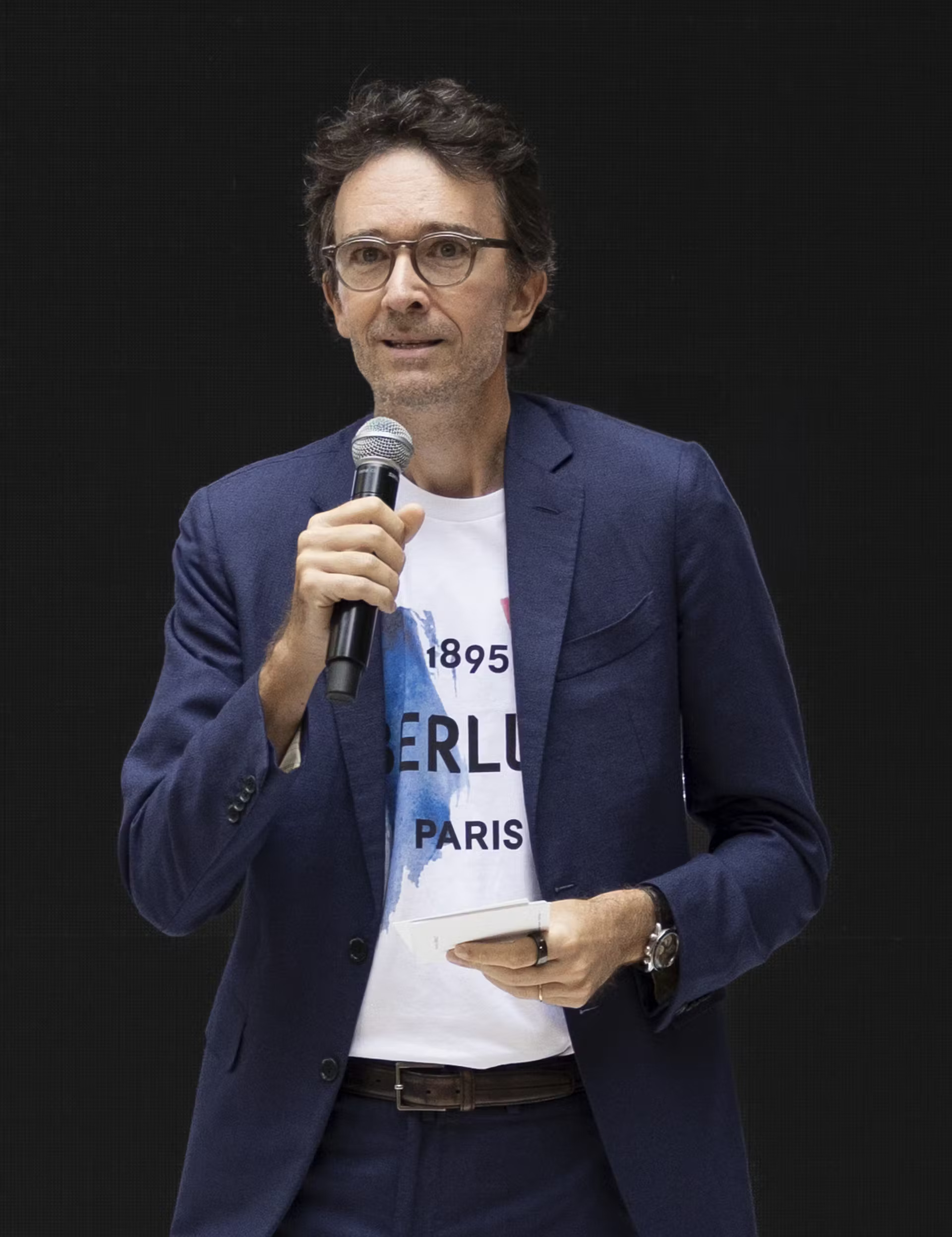
Antoine Arnault, MBA 2006, CEO of Christian Dior SE.

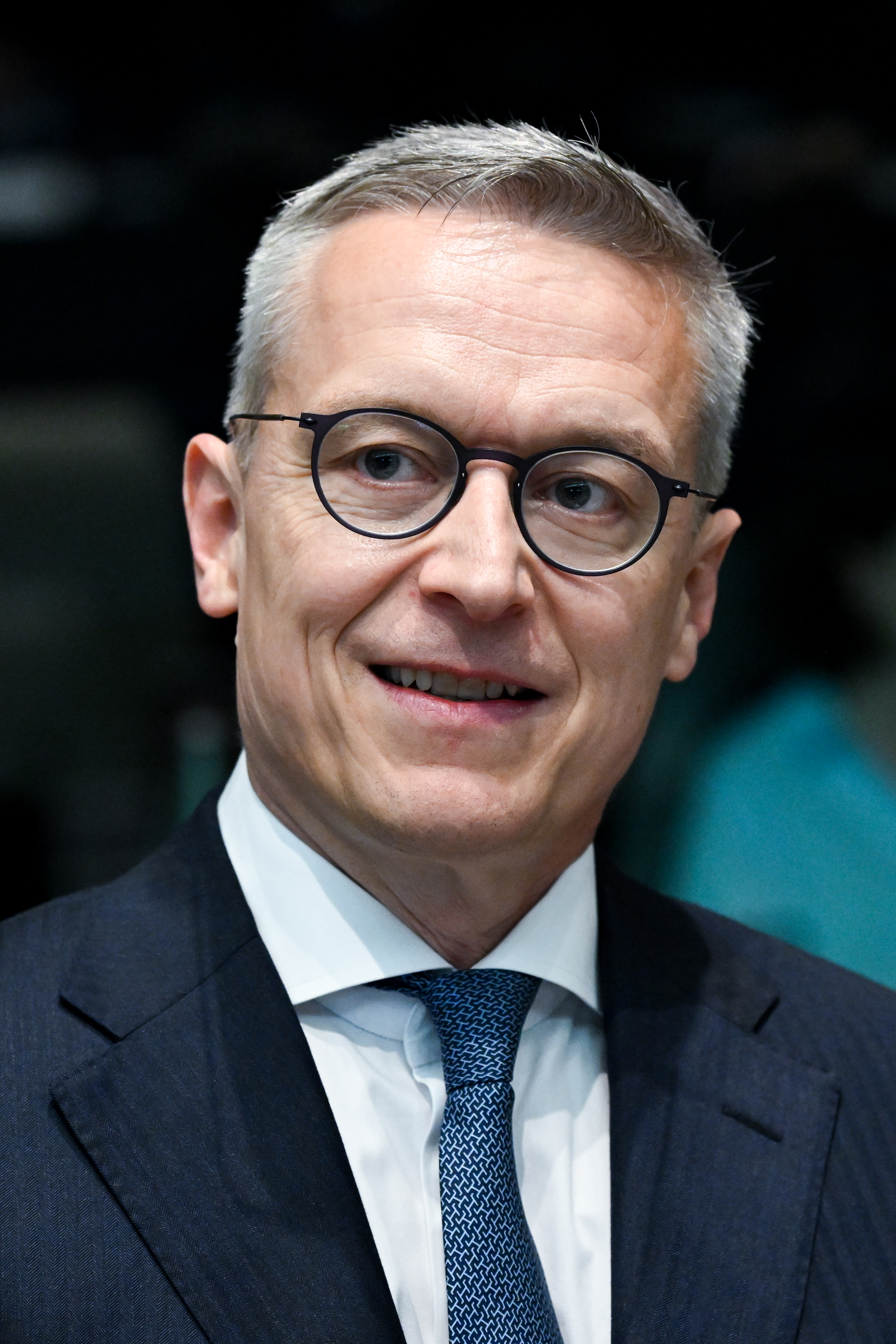
Karsten Wildberger, MBA 2000, German Minister of Digital Transformation, former CEO of Ceconomy.

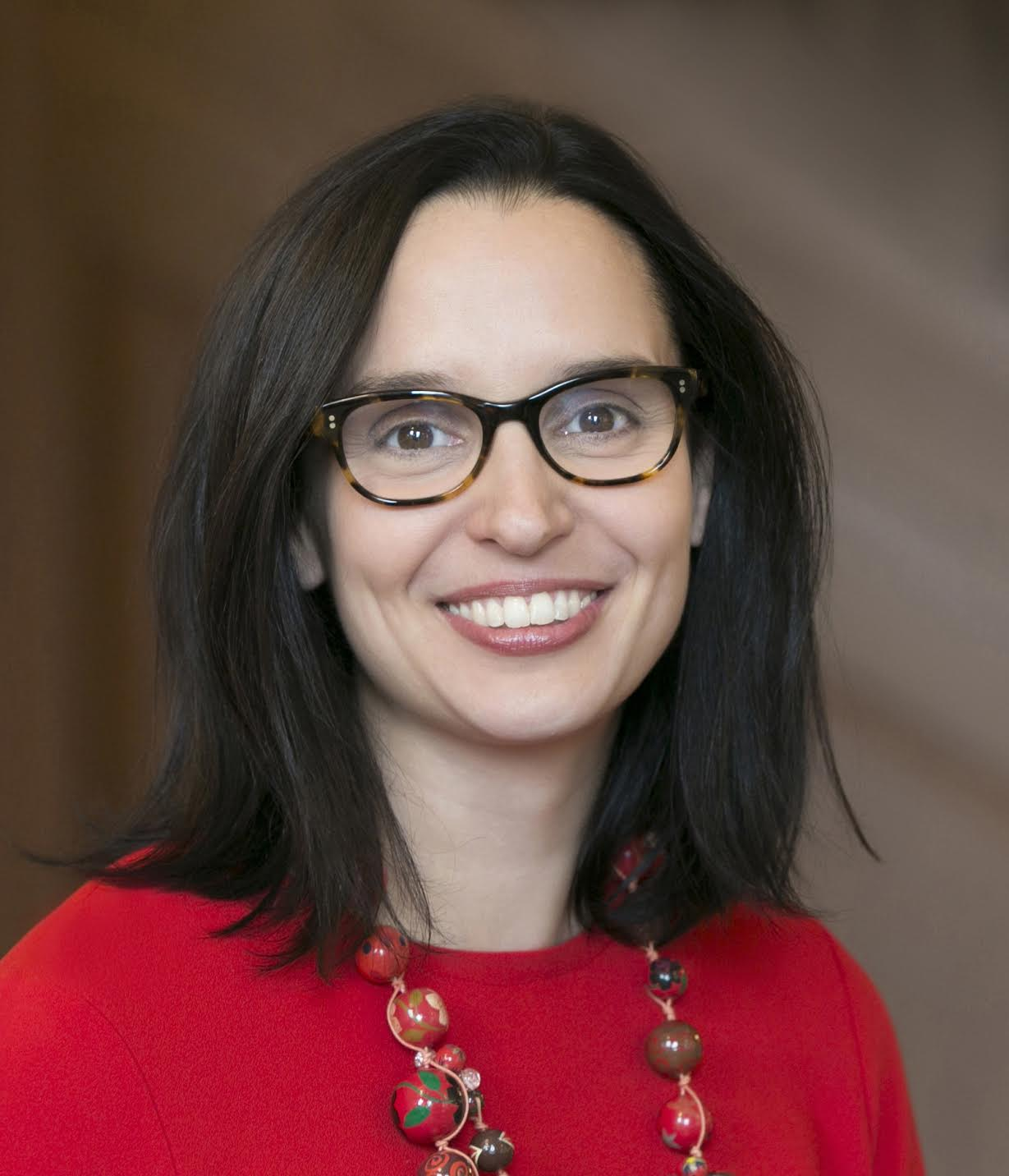
Julie Battilana, PhD 2006, Joseph C. Wilson Professor at Harvard Business School and the Alan L. Gleitsman Professor at the Harvard Kennedy School.

The INSEAD alumni community consists of 75,080 individuals across 187 countries with 178 nationalities.

The MBA programme has produced the second-highest number of Financial Times Global 500 CEOs, behind Harvard Business School. It is amongst the largest 20 producers of ultra high-net-worth individuals across all educational institutions, and is also amongst the top 10 producers of billionaire alumni amongst global MBA programmes. The INSEAD MBA alumni are fourth worldwide in terms of capital raised, founder count, and company count (only behind Harvard's, Stanford's, and Wharton's).

== Faculty ==
=== Research ===
INSEAD’s faculty comprises about 170 permanent members from over 40 nationalities, spanning fields such as strategy, organisational behaviour, marketing, finance, and economics. INSEAD ranked ninth in the University of Texas at Dallas's Top 100 Business School Research Rankings (2020–2024) and tenth in the Financial Times global business-school research ranking (2024). Faculty output includes journal articles, books, and teaching cases published through institutions such as The Case Centre.

=== Notable faculty members ===
- Philippe Aghion, Professor of Economics and the Kurt Björklund Chaired Professor of Innovation and Growth, 2025 Nobel Memorial Prize in Economic Sciences "for the theory of sustained growth through creative destruction"
- W. Chan Kim and Renée Mauborgne, Professors of Strategy, co-authors of Blue Ocean Strategy.
- Soumitra Dutta, former Professor of Business and Technology (1989–2012), former Dean of Oxford's Saïd Business School, founding dean of Cornell University's SC Johnson College of Business, pioneer of innovation rankings.
- Christoph Loch, former professor (1994-2011), former Dean of the Cambridge Judge Business School from 2011 to 2021.
- Philip H. Gordon, former Affiliate Professor of Economic and Political Sciences US National Security Advisor (2022-2025) to the Vice President Kamala Harris, former US Assistant Secretary of State for European and Eurasian Affairs (2009-2011) and Special Assistant to the President Obama.
- Arnoud De Meyer, former professor (1983-2006) where he was Dean of MBA programme, former President of Singapore Management University (2010-2019), former Dean of the Cambridge Judge Business School from 2006 to 2010.
- António Borges, former Dean of INSEAD, former Director of the European Department of the International Monetary Fund during the European Debt Crisis, Vice Chairman of Goldman Sachs International.
- Bruce Kogut, former professor known for knowledge-based theory of the firm.
- Edith Penrose, former professor (1978-1984), known for resource-based view.
- Ronald Stuart Burt, former professor, known for structural holes.
- Lars-Hendrik Röller, former professor (1987-1999), former chief economic advisor to Chancellor Angela Merkel, founding president of the European School of Management and Technology (ESMT) in Berlin, known for his works on industrial economics.
- Sumantra Ghoshal, former professor (1985-1994), founding Dean of Indian School of Business in Hyderabad.

== See also ==
- Blue Ocean Strategy – a book and strategy concept developed by INSEAD faculty
- Management science
