= Creative disruption =

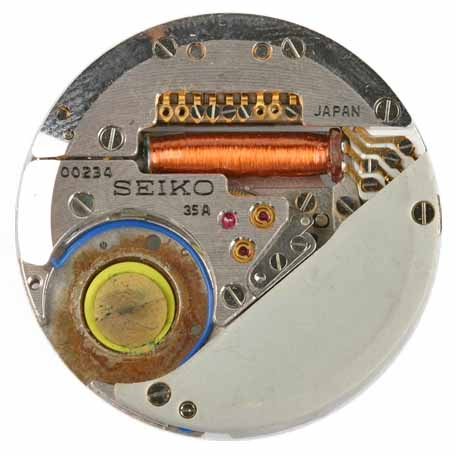
Quartz movement of the Seiko Astron, 1969 early in the quartz crisis

Creative disruption (disruption concept in a creative context) was introduced in 1992 by TBWA's chairman Jean-Marie Dru. It refers to a radical change in a marketplace brought about by the overturning of existing conventions.

== Origins ==
The word "disruption" was originally employed in the English language to describe dramatic events such as earthquakes or highly disturbing news. It was originally used exclusively in a negative sense.

On 1 May 1992 Jean-Marie Dru launched the Disruption concept as a marketing tool by simultaneously publishing a full-page ad headlined "Disruption" in The Wall Street Journal, the Frankfurter Allgemeine and Le Figaro. It explained BDDP's (now TBWA) disruptive methodology. Jean-Marie Dru was the first to employ the word in the business world. As importantly, it was also the first time that the word was given a positive meaning.

Since then, the word was progressively adopted by the business community and has featured in countless press articles in publications such as Forbes, Fast Company, and AdAge.

In 1996, Jean-Marie Dru published a book entitled Disruption: Overturning Conventions and Shaking Up the Marketplace in which he explained the Disruption methodology.

In 1997, Harvard Business School Professor Clayton Christensen co-authored with Joseph Bower, The Innovator's dilemma, a book about disruptive technologies and disruptive innovations.

== Theory ==
The Disruption concept refers to the process of breaking conventions to accelerate movement to the future, without cutting off from the past. It applies to both business and marketing. As a methodology, it goes one step further than the concept of creative destruction.

Professor Clayton Christensen has defined "disruptive innovation", and by extension disruption, in a different way. For him, disruption is the process of newcomers penetrating at the low end of a market and then moving up the value chain. Jean-Marie Dru has always promoted a broader definition and practical business applications. For him, Disruption, as a practical concept, is about bringing radical change, as opposed to incremental, linear change.

=== In marketing ===
Creative disruption is a phrase that has been used in the marketing world for more than a decade to describe the desired break in existing patterns of behavior of the target audience in response to a highly creative message (advertising). "Disruption" signals a departure from the norm. Disruptive messaging disrupts the mediocrity in the deluge of advertising the consumer encounters. Creative disruption helps disrupt the normal flow in the way a target processes a massive volume of marketing messaging, so they pause to consider the message they have received.

Techniques employed in creative disruption are as boundless as creativity, but may include:

- Contrasting messaging
- Unusual or out of place presentation or placement
- Exaggerated presentation
- Intensely targeted messaging

Jean-Marie Dru chairman of TBWA Worldwide gives his own definition of creative disruption in his book entitled Disruption: Overturning Conventions and Shaking Up the Marketplace published in 1996 and translated in twelve languages: "Disruption is a way of thinking defying conventions and creating new visions capable of making our clients' brands grow faster."

The aims of creative disruption include:

- Developing marketing messages which will be remembered and acted upon (which will improve performance/ROI of marketing expenditures).
- Improving brand perceptions and other market indicators (e.g., awareness, understanding, interest, engagement, etc.).
- Disrupting the flow of traditional marketing strategies to make existing business and marketing techniques obsolete.
- Creating new business innovations that lead to new markets and new marketing techniques.

=== In business ===
Creative disruption has also been used as a general business term to denote instituting challenge (disruption) within a business to break old corporate habits; this disruption is instituted by the institution itself (or its management) and requires the business to adapt and improve its business model so that it can better succeed. Every business continues to adjust to disruptions, as competitors respond to a business' unique offering. Creative disruption helps a business gain a competitive advantage by seeking tipping points for improvement before competitors replicate and/or improve upon the business model

"Creative disruption" as a term is sometimes confused with two other terms: "creative destruction" and "disruptive innovation", but can be easily differentiated by their goals:

- In creative destruction, the goal is to tear down/clear away the existing so that a new foundation can be built, and the economy can expand.
- In creative disruption, the goal is to expose flaws in the current business model, highlight areas where improvement/changes are needed, and to help inspire adaptation of the business model for future growth.
- In disruptive innovation, the goal is to bring about a new market entirely, such as the development of the consumer camera in 1888 by Kodak or the use of the internet to conduct online trading for collectibles by eBay in the 1990s. Quartz movements in watches disrupted the watch industry.

== Emergence and acceptance ==
In 1992, Disruption has been registered as a trademark in twelve countries including France, United Kingdom, Germany, Benelux, and Italy. In 2018, TBWA\Group is the owner of the Disruption trademark in 55 countries, including those of the European Union, the United States, Russia, India, Japan, Brazil, South Africa and Turkey.

The Disruption methodology has three parts: convention, vision, disruption. It consists in identifying the cultural conventions around a brand, then defining a vision for it, and lastly developing a disruptive strategy. The purpose of this is to free the brand from existing conventions on the marketplace and to help it grow by building a new and engaging vision.

The Disruption method is about breaking conventions, it is not about destroying a market. As TBWA's chairman Jean-Marie Dru said: "We have to draw a fine line between what should be changed and what should not be changed. And this is what Disruption, as a methodology, is all about."

TBWA's Disruption can be used to deal with both "marketing and business issues". The Disruption methodology has been praised by personalities such as Richard Branson, Bill Taylor and Tom Peters.

The Disruption concept has progressively served as a key descriptor for business consultancies and analysts, and featured in several magazines including Fortune (who referred to Steve Jobs as the "Master of Disruption"), Forbes, Fast Company, AdAge, Campaign, Le Nouvel Economiste, L'Expansion, Personnel, CB News, Harvard Business Review, The Economist and TechCrunch.

== See also ==
- Blockchain
- Counter-culture
- Counter-protest
- Creative destruction
- Exposé
- Fanzine
- Internet radio
- Marketing warfare strategies
- Podcast
- Politainment
- Pulp novels
- Social activism
