= Technology support net =

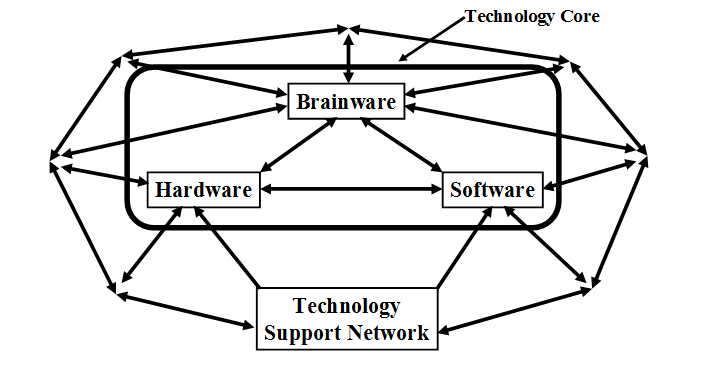
Structure of technology

A technology support net (TSN) is the set of physical, energy, information, legal and cultural structures supporting the development of a given technology. In order to function effectively, the technology core (hardware, software and brainware) needs an embedding TSN. Changes in the core then trigger requisite changes in TSN. Any core and its TSN co-evolve in a symbiotic way of mutual strengthening. At certain stage, TSN starts dictating acceptable changes in the core and ultimately becomes an effective barrier to further innovation. At such point, a time for new, disruptive technology emerges.

The entire structure of the technology core and its support network of requisite flows are sketched in Figure 1. It is clear that the architecture of the TSN functions as the main determinant of technology use, change and the rate of innovation. Milan Zeleny in his book Human Systems Management, has laid down the foundation of modern technology management, innovation and change.

TSN is the necessary condition for continued technology core innovation. Without matching the support network, any new technology has little chance of succeeding. The infrastructure of technology support net, when fully established, could present significant barriers to significant innovation. The process of innovation is no longer open and autonomous, but often technically and politically subservient to the “holders and owners” of the support net.

Technology, through its requisite support net, limits and predetermines the flows and types of innovation. Nowadays the processes of invention and innovation are not limited only by lack of knowledge or too narrow business criteria, but by the defenders of the existing support network (including infrastructure). The focus is not so much on hardware (which is becoming commoditized), nor software or brainware, but on the boundaries and architecture of the support net itself.

== Components of technology ==
Any technology can be divided into four key components:

=== Hardware ===
The physical structure or logical layout, plant or equipment of machine or contrivance. This is the means to carry out required tasks of transformation to achieve purpose or goals. Hardware therefore refers not only to particular physical structure of components, but also to their logical layout.

=== Software ===
The set of rules, guidelines, and algorithms necessary for using the hardware (program, covenants, standards, rules of usage) to carry out the tasks. This is the know-how, which means how to carry out tasks to achieve purpose or goals.

=== Brainware ===
The purpose (objectives and goals), reason and justification for using or deploying the hardware/software in a particular way. This is the know-what and the know-why of technology. That is, the determination of what to use or deploy, when, where and why.

These three components form the technology core. The components of the technology core are co-determinant, their relations circular and mutually enhancing.

The interdependence among the three components is well illustrated in the example of automobile as technology: A car consists of its own physical structure and logical layout, its own hardware. Its software consists of operating rules of the push, turn, press, etc., described in manuals or acquired through learning. The brainware is supplied by the driver and includes decisions where to go, when, how fast, which way and why to use a car at all. Computers, satellites or the Internet can be defined in terms of these above three dimensions. Any information technology or system should also be clearly identifiable through its hardware, software and brainware.

=== Technology Support Net ===
TSN is a network of flows: materials, information, energies, skills, laws, rules of conduct that circulate to, through and from the network in order to enable the proper functioning of the technology core and the achieving of given purpose or goals. Ultimately, all the requisite network flows are initiated, maintained and consumed by people participating in the use and support of the use of a given technology. They might similarly and simultaneously participate in supporting many different technologies through many different TSNs.

Sameer Kumar wrote that TSNs can be intermeshed into larger hyper networks, thereby revealing important complementary, competing and collaborating technologies. The relationship between the technology core and its requisite TSN is that of mutual enhancement and codetermination.

Every unique technology core gives rise to a specific and requisite TSN and thus to a specific set of relationships among people. Ultimately, the TSN can be traced to and translated into the relationships among human participants: initiators, providers and maintainers of the requisite flows in cooperative social settings. In this sense, every technology is a form of a social relationship brought forth from the background environment.

The following example describes the various social relationships among people caused by technology support net. As for the automobile technology, its TSN consists of an infrastructure of roads, bridges, facilities and traffic signals, but also of maintenance and emergency services, rules and laws of conduct, institutions of their enforcement, style and culture of driving behavior, etc. A large number of people have to be organized in a specific and requisite pattern in order to enable cars to function as technology. Moreover, technology and its four components could also be defined from the vantage point of its own user or observer, not in a context-free or absolute sense. In other words, roads, bridges and traffic signals can be technologies themselves, with their own hardware, software, brainware and support nets. For example, traffic lights are a part of the TSN of an automobile, but their own hardware can be driven by their own software (a computer-controlled switching program or schedule) and brainware (purposes of safety, volume and flow control, and interaction with pedestrians). This technology core has its own support net of electricity, signal interpretations and car traffic. So the traffic light is a technology of its own. Similarly, a piece of software from some technology can itself become viewed as technology, in order to achieve specific business purposes or goals with its own hardware, software, brainware and TSN.

== Functions of technology ==
At its most fundamental, technology is a tool used in transforming inputs into output (products) or, more generally, towards achieving purposes or goals. For example, the inputs can be material, information, skills or services. The product can be goods, services or information. Such a tool can be both physical (machine, computer) and logical (methodology, technique). Technology as a tool does not have to be from steel, wood or silica, it could also be a recipe, process or algorithm.

The nature of technology has changed in the global era during the development of human history: it is becoming more integrative and more knowledge-oriented, it is available globally and it includes also logical schemes, procedures and software, not just tools and machinery. It tends to complement or extend the user, not to make him a simple appendage. In order to utilize technology efficiently and effectively, it should be viewed as a form of social relationship, with hardware and software being enabled by brainware and the requisite support network.

This is the view from Joseph Stiglitz, the recipient of the Nobel Memorial Prize in Economic Sciences (2001) on technology transfer:

" History teaches us that transferring hardware is insufficient and ineffective. Codified technical information assumes a whole background of contextual knowledge and practices that might be very incomplete in a developing country. Implementing a new technology in a rather different environment is itself a creative act, not just a copied behavior. Getting a complex technical system to function near its norms and repairing it when it malfunctions are activities drawing upon a slowly accumulated reservoir of tacit knowledge that cannot be easily transferred or ‘downloaded’ to a developing country. "

Stiglitz's emphasis is on the insufficiency of information (or codified “knowledge”) and the hardware-software mindset. Information can always be “downloaded”, knowledge cannot. Knowledge has to be produced within the local circumstances and structural support.

In recent times, technology refers to a package of hardware, software, brainware – and primarily, the requisite support net which fixates, limits and predetermines the flows and types of innovation. In many modern technologies, the hardware is becoming a commodity, the least decisive component, a mere physical casing for the real power of effective knowledge contents. The enabling technology support network is often becoming the most important component of technology:

Charu Chandra described that technology organizations aim at achieving total system productivity, not task. In order to achieve this, workflow within and between departments must be integrated. This is achieved by organizing a project with interconnected tasks of activities that use inputs to produce output(s) according to common objectives and goals. One of the ways to do this is managing its effects on the support net of requisite relationships. In the near future it will not be the number of computers per capita, but the density and capacity of their network interconnectedness which will determine their effective usage.
