= Knowledge-based theory of the firm =

Business theory

In business, the knowledge-based theory of the firm, or knowledge-based view (KBV), considers knowledge to be an essentially important, scarce, and valuable resource in a firm.

According to the knowledge-based theory of the firm, the possession of knowledge-based resources, known as intellectual capital, is essential in dynamic business environments. These resources contribute to lower costs, foster innovation and creativity, improve efficiencies, and deliver customer benefits. Collectively, they are considered key drivers of overall organizational performance.

== Main features ==
The proponents of the theory argue that, because knowledge-based resources are usually complex and difficult to imitate, different sources of knowledge and intellectual capital can be seen as the main sources for a sustainable competitive advantage. The theory assumes that knowledge is the most important resource used by a firm, and that it is individuals, rather than organizations, who create and retain knowledge. Organizational activity in regard to knowledge can then be seen as embedding knowledge within its organizational culture and identity, policies, routines, documents, systems, and employees. Information technologies can play an important role in the knowledge-based view of the firm in that information systems can be used to synthesize, enhance, and expedite large-scale intra- and inter-firm knowledge management. Organizational hierarchies may assist with processing information, but the integration of knowledge into a decision-making tool is only conducted effectively by individuals.

Originating from the strategic management literature, this perspective builds upon and extends the resource-based view of the firm (RBV) initially promoted by Penrose (1959) and later expanded by others (Wernerfelt 1984, Barney 1991, Conner 1991). Although the resource-based view of the firm recognizes the important role of knowledge in firms that achieve a competitive advantage, proponents of the knowledge-based view argue that the resource-based perspective does not go far enough. Specifically, the RBV treats knowledge as a generic resource, rather than having special characteristics. It therefore does not distinguish between different types of knowledge-based capabilities.

== Status ==
Whether or not the knowledge-based theory actually constitutes a theory has been the subject of considerable debate. According to one notable proponent of the knowledge-based view firm (KBV), "the emerging knowledge-based view of the firm is not a theory of the firm in any formal sense". The research on the knowledge-based view of the firm is a sub-discourse on resources and capabilities, which is part of the broader research on strategy.

== See also ==
- Resource-based view
- Relational view
- Knowledge management
- Theory of the firm
- Knowledge economy
- Intellectual capital
- Organizational learning
- Strategy

== Sources ==
- Conner, K.R. (1991). "A Historical Comparison of the Resource-Based Theory and Five Schools of Thought Within Industrial Organization Economics: Do We Have a New Theory of the Firm?". Journal of Management. 17 (1): 121–154. doi:10.1177/014920639101700109. S2CID 142831045.
- Grant, R.M., "Prospering in Dynamically-Competitive Environments: Organizational Capability as Knowledge Integration", Organization Science (7:4), 1996, pp. 375–387.
- Kogut, Bruce, and Udo Zander, "Knowledge of the Firm, Combinative Capabilities, and the Replication of Technology", Organization Science (3:3), 1992, pp. 383–397.
- Kogut, Bruce, and Udo Zander, "The Network as Knowledge: Generative Rules and the Emergence of Structure”, Strategic Management Journal (21), 2000, pp. 405–425.
- Nickerson, J. and Zenger, T., "A knowledge-based theory of the firm: the problem-solving perspective", Organization Science, (15:6) 2004, 617-632.
- Nonaka, I., and Takeuchi, H., The Knowledge-Creating Company: How Japanese Companies Create the Dynamics of Innovation, Oxford University Press, New York, 1995.
