= Udo Zander =

Swedish business theorist (born 1959)

Udo Zander (born March 30, 1959) is a Swedish organizational theorist, and Professor in Business Administration at the Stockholm School of Economics until 2012. He is particularly known for his work with Bruce Kogut on knowledge-based theory of the firm.

== Biography ==
Zander obtained his MA in Business Administration from the Stockholm School of Economics in 1986. On a Fulbright Scholarship he studied at the University of California, Berkeley in 1986-87 and at Stanford University in 1987. Back at the Stockholm School of Economics he obtained his PhD in International Business is 1991 with the thesis, entitled "Exploiting a technical edge: voluntary and involuntary dissemination of technology."

After graduation Zander in 1991 started his academic career at the Stockholm School of Economics, where he was appointed Associate Professor in 1996, and Full Professor in business administration, specializing in international business since 2002. From 2009 to 2012 he was Ragnar Söderberg Professor in Economics. He was also director of the Center for Advanced Studies in Leadership at the Stockholm School of Economics. In 2007 he was elected Royal Swedish Academy of Sciences.

Zander's research interests concern the management of multinational companies, knowledge management, the theory of the firm, and particularly "the impact and power of ideas on international firms and society."

== Selected publications ==
- Zander, Udo. Exploiting a technical edge: voluntary and involuntary dissemination of technology. (1991).
- Hakanson, Lars, and Udo Zander. Managing international research and development. Institutet för Internationellt Företagande, 1986.

Articles, a selection:

- Kogut, Bruce, and Udo Zander. "Knowledge of the firm, combinative capabilities, and the replication of technology." Organization science 3.3 (1992): 383-397.
- Kogut, Bruce, and Udo Zander. "Knowledge of the firm and the evolutionary theory of the multinational corporation." Journal of international business studies (1993): 625-645.
- Zander, Udo, and Bruce Kogut. "Knowledge and the speed of the transfer and imitation of organizational capabilities: An empirical test." Organization science 6.1 (1995): 76-92.
- Kogut, Bruce, and Udo Zander. "What firms do? Coordination, identity, and learning." Organization science 7.5 (1996): 502-518.
