= W. Chan Kim =

South Korean business theorist (born 1951)

- Born: 1951 (age 74–75)
- Education: Ross School of Business
- Occupation: Business theorist
- Employer: INSEAD
- Notable work: Blue Ocean Strategy (2005)
- Awards: Nobels Colloquia Prize (2008)

W. Chan Kim (Korean: 김위찬; born 1951) is a South Korean business theorist. He is a Professor of Strategy and Management at INSEAD, and co-director of the INSEAD Blue Ocean Strategy Institute in Fontainebleau, France. He is known as co-author of the 2005 book Blue Ocean Strategy.

== Biography ==
Born in Korea, Kim was educated at Ross School of Business, where late 1970s he started his academic career eventually becoming Professor. In 1992 he moved to France, where he became Professor of Strategy and Management at INSEAD, and co-director of the INSEAD Blue Ocean Strategy Institute in Fontainebleau, France.

Kim has served on the board of multiple multinationals, and is Fellow of the World Economic Forum.

In 2008 he was awarded the Nobels Colloquia Prize for Leadership on Business and Economic Thinking. He was ranked second in the Thinkers50 of the most influential management thinkers alive.

== Work ==
=== Creating New Market Space ===
In their 1997 Harvard Business Review article "Value Innovation" Kim and Renée Mauborgne presented a popular post-Porter model. In this article they described a "value innovation" model in which companies must look outside their present paradigms to find new value propositions.

Their approach complements most of Michael Porter's thinking, especially the concept of differentiation. They later went on to publish their ideas in the book Blue Ocean Strategy. Thus it is difficult, but not impossible, to topple a firm that has established a dominant standard.

=== Blue Ocean Strategy ===
Blue Ocean Strategy is a business strategy book first published in 2005 and written by W. Chan Kim and Renée Mauborgne of The Blue Ocean Strategy Institute at INSEAD. The book illustrates what the authors believe is the best organizational strategy to generate growth and profits. Blue Ocean Strategy suggests that an organization should create new demand in an uncontested market space, or a "Blue Ocean", rather than compete head-to-head with other suppliers in an existing industry.

== Publications ==
Kim has published two well-known books and numerous articles on strategic management of multinationals.

- 2005 Blue Ocean Strategy. How to Create Uncontested Market Space and Make the Competition Irrelevant. With Renée Mauborgne. Boston, Massachusetts: Harvard Business School Press.
- 2017 Blue Ocean Shift. Beyond Competing. With Renée Mauborgne. New York: Hachette Books

Selected articles

- Hill, Charles WL, Peter Hwang, and W. Chan Kim. An eclectic theory of the choice of international entry mode, Strategic Management Journal 11.2 (1990): 117–128.
- Kim, W. Chan and Peter Hwang. "Global strategy and multinationals' entry mode choice", Journal of International Business Studies (1992): 29–53.
- Kim, W. Chan and Renée A. Mauborgne, Procedural justice, attitudes, and subsidiary top management compliance with multinationals' corporate strategic decisions, Academy of Management Journal, 36.3 (1993): 502-526.
- Kim, W. Chan and Renée Mauborgne, Value innovation, Harvard Business Review, 1 (1997).
- Kim, W. Chan and Renée Mauborgne, Strategy, value innovation, and the knowledge economy, Sloan Management Review 40 (1999): 41–54.
- Kim, W. Chan and Renée A. Mauborgne, Charting Your Company’s Future, Harvard Business Review, volume 80, number 6, June 2002

Along with Renée Mauborgne, Kim has also written many case studies, and they have been jointly featured among the top 40 case authors consistently, since the list was first published in 2016 by The Case Centre. They ranked sixth in 2018/19, seventh in 2017/18, eighth in 2016/17 and ninth in 2015/16.
