= Blue Ocean Strategy =

Marketing theory book

- First edition cover
- Author: W. Chan Kim and Renée Mauborgne
- Language: English
- Genre: Business Management
- Publisher: Harvard Business Review Press
- Publication date: 2004, 2015 (expanded edition)
- Media type: Print (hardback)
- Pages: 240 pp, 287 pp (expanded edition)
- ISBN: 1-59139-619-0 ISBN 978-1-62527-449-6 (expanded edition)
- OCLC: 56421900, 905587295 (expanded edition)
- Dewey Decimal: 658.8/02 22, 658.8/02 23 (expanded edition)
- LC Class: HF5415.153 .K53 2004
- Website: blueoceanstrategy.com

Blue Ocean Strategy is a book published in 2005 written by W. Chan Kim and Renée Mauborgne, professors at INSEAD, and the name of the marketing theory detailed in the book.

They assert that the strategic moves outlined in the book create a leap in value for the company, its buyers, and its employees while unlocking new demand and making the competition irrelevant. The book presents analytical frameworks and tools to foster an organization's ability to systematically create and capture "blue oceans"—unexplored new market areas. An expanded edition of the book was published in 2015, while two sequels entitled Blue Ocean Shift and Beyond Disruption were published in 2017 and 2023 respectively.

== Book layout and concepts ==
The book is divided into three parts:

1. The first part presents key concepts of blue ocean strategy, including Value Innovation – the simultaneous pursuit of differentiation and low cost – and key analytical tools and frameworks such as the strategy canvas and the four actions framework. The four actions framework aids in eliminating the trade-off between differentiation and low cost within a company. The four actions framework consists of the following:
  - Raise: This questions which factors must be raised within an industry in terms of product, pricing or service standards.
  - Eliminate: This questions which areas of a company or industry could be eliminated to reduce costs and to create an entirely new market.
  - Reduce: This questions which areas of a company's product or service are not entirely necessary but play a significant role in your industry, for example, the cost of manufacturing a certain material for a product could be reduced. Therefore, it can be reduced without eliminating it.
  - Create: This prompts companies to be innovative with their products. By creating an entirely new product or service, a company can create their own market through differentiation from the competition.
2. The second part describes the four principles of blue ocean strategy formulation. These four formulation principles address how an organization can create blue oceans by looking across the six conventional boundaries of competition (Six Paths Framework), reduce their planning risk by following the four steps of visualizing strategy, create new demand by unlocking the three tiers of non-customers and launch a commercially viable blue ocean idea by aligning unprecedented utility of an offering with strategic pricing and target costing and by overcoming adoption hurdles. The book uses many examples across industries to demonstrate how to break out of traditional competitive (structuralist) strategic thinking and to grow demand and profits for the company and the industry by using blue ocean (reconstructionist) strategic thinking. The four principles are:
  1. how to create uncontested market space by reconstructing market boundaries,
  2. focusing on the big picture,
  3. reaching beyond existing demand and supply in new market spaces
  4. getting the strategic sequence right.
3. The third and final part describes the two key implementation principles of blue ocean strategy including tipping point leadership and fair process. These implementation principles are essential for leaders to overcome the four key organizational hurdles that can prevent even the best strategies from being executed. The four key hurdles comprise the cognitive, resource, motivational and political hurdles that prevent people involved in strategy execution from understanding the need to break from status quo, finding the resources to implement the new strategic shift, keeping your people committed to implementing the new strategy, and from overcoming the powerful vested interests that may block the change.

=== Proposition ===
In the book the authors draw the attention of their readers to the correlation between success stories across industries and the formulation of strategies that provide a solid base for creating unconventional success – a strategy termed as "Blue Ocean Strategy". Unlike the "Red Ocean Strategy", the conventional approach to business that focuses on beating competition and is derived from military organization, the "Blue Ocean Strategy" tries to align innovation with utility, price and cost positions. The book challenges the phenomenon of making a conventional choice between product/service differentiation and lower cost, and instead suggests that both differentiation and lower costs are achievable simultaneously.

== History of the concept ==
The concept was initially developed in the 1990s when W. Chan Kim was taking part in a consulting project for Philips, headed by the management scholar C. K. Prahalad. Working with consultants from the Mac Group (a consulting company that was later bought by Capgemini), he developed strategy tools leading to the publication of a series of articles in the Harvard Business Review, and then in 2005 of the Blue Ocean Strategy book.

Nintendo's Wii video game console, first released in 2006, has been often considered an example of the blue ocean concept. Instead of trying to compete with the high performance and computational power of the consoles from Sony and Microsoft, Nintendo designed the Wii's hardware to focus on innovative gameplay, incorporating the use of motion controls atypical of video games. These changes brought new gameplay ideas to the system as well as reduced the cost of the console compared to its competitors. As a result, the Wii sold more than 100 million units over its lifetime, far outselling the competitors.

== Reception ==
Since Blue Ocean Strategy was published in 2004, it has been translated into 43 languages and has sold over 3.5 million copies. The book was named a bestseller by the Wall Street Journal, BusinessWeek, and Amazon.com. It was selected as one of the “Best Books of 2005” by Fast Company magazine, won “The Best Business Book of 2005” Prize at the Frankfurt Book Fair, and achieved bestselling book of the decade status by 800-CEO-READ (2000–2010). Strategy+Business magazine selected it as #1 strategy book of 2005.

In 2009, Blue Ocean Strategy was selected by the China Daily and the China Research Institute as one of the 40 most influential books in the History of the People's Republic of China (1949–2009) along with Adam Smith's ″The Wealth of Nations″ under the category of ″Economics and Finance.″ In 2010, Polish group ThinkTank selected Blue Ocean Strategy as one of the Top 20 books that have shaped Polish Leaders. Blue Ocean Strategy won the Thinkers50 2011 Strategy Award for Best Business Book of the decade and in the same year, it was introduced to the Fast Company Leadership Hall of Fame. In 2013, the book received the GoodBooks Award in the Management category by the Vietnamese Institute for Research on Education Development (IRED), was selected as one of the 15 Best Business Books of the last decade in Russia by the Kommersant.ru magazine, and selected as one of the top three best management books in Japan by the Diamond Harvard Business Review.

The Wall Street Journal recommends Blue Ocean Strategy for the top manager. Forbes calls it one of the ten business trends for 2013 and argues that "blue ocean strategies are more influential than ever." BusinessWeek says that "Blue Ocean Strategy will have you wondering why companies need so much persuasion to stay out of shark-infested waters." The Business Strategy Review said the book "challenges everything you knew about strategy", and the Business Times called on firms to "adopt blue ocean strategy to stay ahead." Marketplace magazine recommends Blue Ocean Strategy as a book "you need to read." In addition, the book has received many positive reviews from various publications that include Chicago Tribune, Daily Herald, Credit Union Journal, Vancouver Sun, Association Meetings, Strategy & Leadership, and Business First, among many others.

== Criticisms ==
While Kim and Mauborgne propose approaches to finding uncontested market space, at the present there are few success stories of companies that have actively applied their theories. One success story that does exist is Nintendo, who applied the blue ocean strategy to the Nintendo DS, Wii, and Nintendo Switch.

With just one case study, however, this hole in their data persists despite the publication of value innovation concepts dating back to 1997. Hence, a critical question is whether this book and its related ideas are descriptive rather than prescriptive. The authors present many examples of successful innovations, and then explain from their Blue Ocean perspective – essentially interpreting success through their lenses.

The research process followed by the authors has been criticized on several grounds. Criticisms include claims that no control group was used, that there is no way to know how many companies using a blue ocean strategy failed and the theory is thus unfalsifiable, that a deductive process was not followed, and that the examples in the book were selected to "tell a winning story". Meanwhile, several attempts at empirical validations and conceptual extensions of the blue ocean strategy have been published.

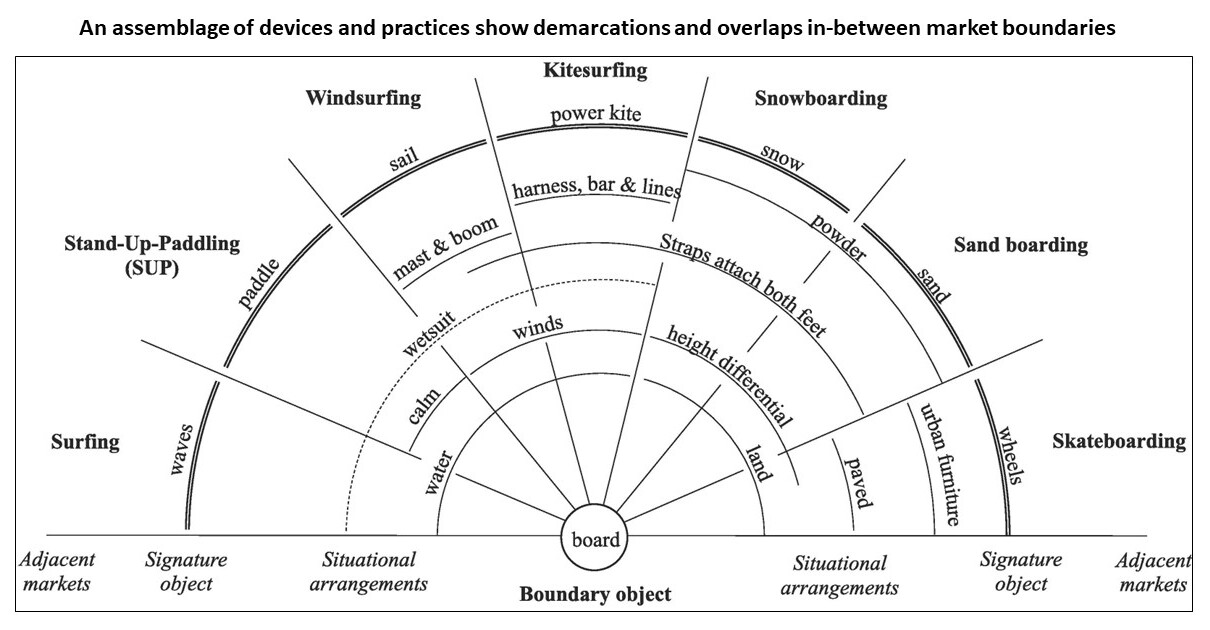
An illustration of overlapping boundaries across multiple board-sport markets

The Blue Ocean strategy is based on the idea that firms can restructure market boundaries, and yet it lacks clear parameters to determine what constitutes the boundaries of each market. For instance, research shows that market boundaries are porous and are continuously made and remade through boundary work.

Brand and communication are taken for granted and do not represent a key to success. Kim and Mauborgne take the marketing of a value innovation as a given, assuming that marketing success will come as a matter of course.

It is argued that rather than a theory, blue ocean strategy is an extremely successful attempt to brand a set of already existing concepts and frameworks with a highly "sticky" idea.

Many of the book's key concepts were previously covered in Competing For The Future by Gary Hamel and C.K. Prahalad, which was published in 1996. The authors encouraged managers to stake out new marketing space, which they termed white space, in order to "create and dominate emerging opportunities".

== See also ==
- Co-opetition
- Disruptive innovation
- Economics of Strategy
- Thinking Strategically
