= Bruce Kogut =

American business theorist (born 1953)

- Born: 1953 (age 72–73); New York, US
- Known for: knowledge-based view

Academic background
- Education: University of California, Berkeley; Columbia University; MIT
- Thesis: Foreign commerce and economic organization in the German Democratic Republic: a governance approach (1983)

Bruce Mitchel Kogut (born 1953) is an American organizational theorist, and Professor of Leadership and Ethics, Director of the Stanford C. Bernstein Center for Leadership and Ethics at the Columbia Business School. He is particularly known for his work on corporate governance, and with Udo Zander on knowledge-based theory of the firm, and for the research on knowledge networks with Morten Hansen.

== Biography ==
Kogut obtained his BA in Political Science in 1975 at the University of California, Berkeley, his MA in International Affairs in 1978 at the Columbia University, New York and in 1983 his PhD at the MIT Sloan School of Management.

After graduation in 1983, Kogut started his academic career at the Wharton School of the University of Pennsylvania as Assistant Professor at the Department of Management, where he got promoted Associate Professor and eventually Chaired Professor. From 1993 to 1995 he was also Director of Wharton's Emerging Economies Programs, and from 1997 to 2000 Associate Dean for its Doctoral Programs. From 1994 to 2002 he also co-directed the Reginald H. Jones Center for Management Policy, Strategy, and Organization. In 2003 he moved to INSEAD, where he was appointed the Eli Lilly Chair in Innovation, Business and Society. From 2004 to 2006 he was also Scientific Director at the EIASM in Brussels, and from 2005 to 2007 founding Director of Insead Social Entrepreneurship Program. Since 2007 back in the United States he is Sanford Bernstein Chaired Professor at the Columbia Business School.

Kogut's research interests are in the field of "comparative and economic sociology, strategy, comparative methods, social entrepreneurship, and governance."

Kogut teaches courses on Governance, Governance and Ethics, and Business Strategies and Solving Social Problems and holds a courtesy affiliation in the Department of Sociology at Columbia University.

== Selected publications ==
=== Books ===
- Dunning, John H.; Kogut, Bruce Mitchel; Blomström, Magnus (1990). Globalization of Firms and the Competitiveness of Nations. Institute of Economic Research, Lund University. ISBN 978-0-86238-269-8.
- Kogut, Bruce, ed. (1993). Country Competitiveness: Technology and the Organizing of Work. Oxford University Press. ISBN 978-0-19-536097-4.
- Bowman, Edward H.; Kogut, Bruce Mitchel, eds. (1995). Redesigning the Firm. Oxford University Press. ISBN 978-0-19-508710-9.
- Kogut, Bruce Mitchel, ed. (2003). The Global Internet Economy. MIT Press. ISBN 978-0-262-61204-3.
- Cornelius, Peter K.; Kogut, Bruce, eds. (2003). Corporate Governance and Capital Flows in a Global Economy. Oxford University Press. ISBN 978-0-19-803734-7.
- Kogut, Bruce (2008). Knowledge, Options, and Institutions. Oxford University Press. ISBN 978-0-19-928252-4.
- Kogut, Bruce Mitchel, ed. (2012). The Small Worlds of Corporate Governance. MIT Press. ISBN 978-0-262-01727-5.

=== Selected articles ===
- Kogut, Bruce. "Joint ventures: Theoretical and empirical perspectives." Strategic management journal 9.4 (1988): 319-332.
- Kogut, Bruce, and Udo Zander. "Knowledge of the firm, combinative capabilities, and the replication of technology." Organization science 3.3 (1992): 383-397.
- Kogut, Bruce, and Harbir Singh. "The effect of national culture on the choice of entry mode." Journal of international business studies (1988): 411-432.
- Kogut, Bruce, and Udo Zander. "Knowledge of the firm and the evolutionary theory of the multinational corporation." Journal of international business studies (1993): 625-645.
- Zander, Udo, and Bruce Kogut. "Knowledge and the speed of the transfer and imitation of organizational capabilities: An empirical test." Organization science 6.1 (1995): 76-92.
- Kogut, Bruce, and Udo Zander. "What firms do? Coordination, identity, and learning." Organization science 7.5 (1996): 502-518.
- Almeida, Paul, and Bruce Kogut. "Localization of knowledge and the mobility of engineers in regional networks." Management science 45.7 (1999): 905-917.
