= Joseph Bower =

English cricketer

Domestic team information
- Years: Team
- 1897–1898: Hampshire

Career statistics
Competition	First-class
Matches	3
Runs scored	14
Batting average	4.66
100s/50s	0/0
Top score	8
Balls bowled	430
Wickets	8
Bowling average	20.75
5 wickets in innings	0
10 wickets in match	0
Best bowling	4/43
Catches/stumpings	0/–
- Source: Cricinfo, 4 January 2010

Joseph Bower was an English first-class cricketer.

Bower made his debut in first-class cricket for Hampshire against Cambridge University at Fenner's in 1897, with him taking three wickets for 55 runs in the Cambridge first innings; Hampshire eventually lost the match by an innings. He made a further first-class appearance in 1897 against the touring Gentlemen of Philadelphia at Bournemouth, during which he took his career-best figures of 4 for 43, before making a final appearance in the 1898 County Championship against Lancashire at Old Trafford. In his three first-class matches, Bower took eight wickets at an average of 20.75.
