= Relational view =

In management, the relational view by Jeffrey H. Dyer and Harbir Singh is a theory for considering networks and dyads of firms as the unit of analysis to explain relational rents, i.e., superior individual firm performance generated within that network/dyad. This view has later been extended by Lavie (2006).

== Comparison to other theories ==
The relational view supplements existing views. While the industry structure view explains superior returns with a firm's membership in an industry with specific structural characteristics, and the resource-based view explains superior returns with firm heterogeneity, the relational view argues that idiosyncratic interfirm linkages are a source of relational rents.

== Relational rents ==
Dyer and Singh define a relational rent as "a supernormal profit jointly generated in an exchange relationship that cannot be generated by either firm in isolation and can only be created through the joint idiosyncratic contributions of the specific alliance partners". The achievement of rents is subject to relational risk. Later research suggested companies adopt a relational strategic orientation and design strategies to generate and extract relational rents.

== Sources of relational rents ==
Dyer and Singh propose four sources of relational rents:

1. relation-specific assets,
2. knowledge-sharing routines,
3. complementary resources/capabilities, and
4. effective governance.
