= Milan Zeleny =

Czech American economist (1942–2023)

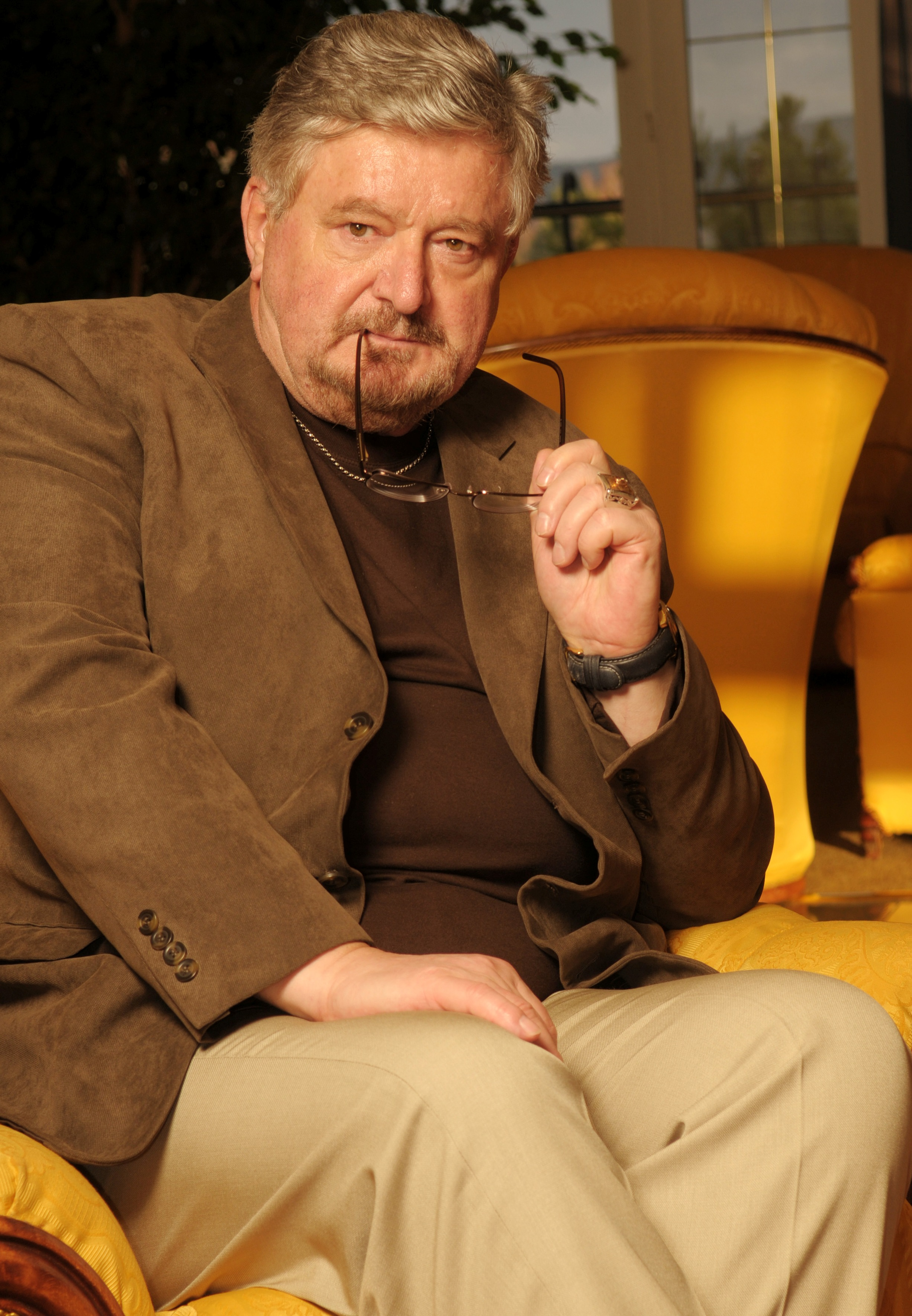
- Zeleny in 2007
- Born: Milan Zelený; January 22, 1942; Klucké Chvalovice, Protectorate of Bohemia and Moravia
- Died: December 24, 2023 (aged 81); Tenafly, New Jersey, U.S.

Academic background
- Education: University of Rochester

Academic work
- Institutions: Professor of Management Systems at Fordham University
- Website: milanzeleny.com

Milan Zeleny (Czech: Milan Zelený; January 22, 1942 – December 24, 2023) was a Czech-American economist, a professor of management systems at Fordham University, New York City. He has done research in the field of decision-making, productivity, knowledge management, and business economics. Zeleny was also a visiting professor at the Tomas Bata University in Zlín, Czech Republic, and has been academic vice dean and professor at Xidian University in Xi’an, China. He was a distinguished visiting professor at Fu Jen Catholic University in Taipei in 2006, at the Indian Institute of Technology in Kanpur in 2007, and at IBMEC in Rio de Janeiro in 2009–10. For many years he has lectured at the Faculty of Architecture, University of Naples.

== Academic focus ==
Zeleny's research focus is multidisciplinary and systems oriented, exploring the interfaces of a number of disciplines, especially economics, business, systems science and socio-biological autopoiesis. Among his contributions are the concepts of Multiple Criteria Decision Making (MCDM), Knowledge management, De Novo Programming, Tradeoffs-free Economics, Social Autopoiesis, Economic Transformation, Technology Support Network, Reintegration of Labor, Systems Self-sustainability and Economic Relocalization.

In Zeleny's book, Human Systems Management: Integrating Knowledge, Management and Systems, World Scientific, 2005 (reprint 2008), he summarizes knowledge as purposeful coordination of action and its implications for the global economics and management. Zeleny also indicates how the sector evolution from agriculture, industry, services and government leads to self-service and disintermediation, the first manifestations of the transformation in economics, which refers to the long-term movement from globalization to the relocalization of economic activities and mass customization of global market.

According to Hirsch Citation and Publication Index, Zeleny was the most cited Czech economist as of 2005.

== Personal life ==
Zeleny was born on January 22, 1942, in a small village of Klucké Chvalovice in Bohemia. He came from the literary family of Vácslav and Vladivoj Zelený. His father, Josef Zelený, founded one of the first organizational consulting firms in the 1930s and 1940s in Prague ("ZET-organizace"). After the communist takeover in 1948, his father became a coal miner (in Kladno) and his uncle worked in the uranium mines of Jáchymov. After studies at the University of Economics, Prague (1959–1964), military service in Prague, and a few years at the Czech Academy of Sciences, he left the communist Czechoslovakia in 1967 to expand his education for Ph.D. in Operations Research and Business Economics at the University of Rochester, where he also received his M.S. in Systems Management in 1970.

In 2012, he declared his intention to run for presidency of the Czech Republic, but then withdrew from the presidential election race. He was a resident of Tenafly, New Jersey.

Zeleny died at his home in New Jersey on December 24, 2023, at the age of 81.

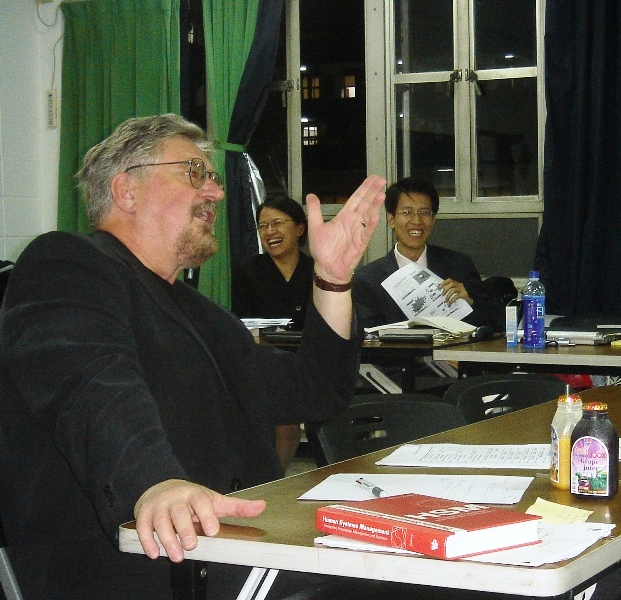
Zeleny in class at Fu Jen Catholic University, Taipei, Taiwan, 2006.

== Academic career ==
Prior to 1967, Zeleny's research involved Critical Path Analysis. In 1972 he initiated research on Multiple Criteria Decision Making (MCDM). Later he devoted himself to the field of Knowledge Management, and released the first publication in this field in 1987. Other areas of research include Games with multiple payoffs, Integrated Process Management (IPM), Knowledge-based theory of fuzzy sets, Baťa System of Management, High-technology management, Mass customization, Portfolio selection, Risk analysis, Measurement of consumer attitudes, Human intuition, Creativity and judgment, Simulation models of biological organization, Autopoiesis, Artificial life (AL), Osmotic growths and synthetic biology, Spontaneous social organizations and early computer modeling (via GPSS, APL, FORTRAN and BASIC).

In later years, his research mainly focused on corporation as a living organism (The BioCycle of Business). He also became active in consulting and later on in CEO coaching, while pursuing practical projects of Entrepreneurial University, Electro-mobility, Recycling and remanufacturing, and Integration of data, information, knowledge and wisdom into a coherent DIKW Management support.

During the years between 1971 and 1982, Zeleny worked as a lecturer at several universities: assistant professor of statistics and management science at University of South Carolina, Columbia, S.C. (1971–1972), associate professor of business administration at Columbia University, New York, (1972–1979), professor of economics at Copenhagen School of Economics, Copenhagen, Denmark, (1979–1980) and professor of management science at European Institute for Advanced Studies in Management (EIASM), Brussels, Belgium, (1980–1981).

From 1982, Zeleny served as professor of management systems at Fordham University at Lincoln Center, New York City. He also accepted his permanent tenured appointment from Fordham University.

== Awards ==
- 1992, Erskine Fellowship University of Canterbury, New Zealand
- 1992, The Edgeworth-Pareto Award awarded by International Society on Multi-criteria Decision Making
- 1990, USIA Fulbright Professor in Prague, Czechoslovakia
- 1990, Bernstein Memorial Lecturer, Tel-Aviv, Israel
- 1980, Alexander von Humboldt Award, Bonn, Germany
- 1979, Rockefeller Foundation Resident Scholar, Bellagio Study Center
- 1977, Norbert Wiener Award of Kybernetes

== Member ==
Among his other adjunct and visiting positions was a visiting professorship of environmental economics at Architettonici ed Ambientali, Dipartimento di Conservazione dei beni, Università degli Studi di Napoli Federico II, Naples, Italy, 1993.

== Author ==
Zeleny was the author of over 600 scientific publications, studies and books including ones on economics, management, cybernetics, operations research, general systems, history of science, total quality management, and simulation of autopoiesis and artificial life (AL). Zeleny has served as the editor-in-chief of Human Systems Management over the last thirty three years. He was also a member of editorial boards of other professional economic journals.

As of December 2013 he served on editorial or advisory boards of

- International Journal of Information Technology and Decision Making
- International Journal of Mobile Learning and Organization, Economics and Management
- Journal of Competitiveness, Information and Operations Management Education
- International Journal of Information and Operations Management Education
- International Journal of Multicriteria Decision Making (IJMCDM)

=== Books ===
Zeleny's books include:

- Human Systems Management: Integrating Knowledge, Management and Systems, World Scientific, 2005
- Information Technology in Business (Thomson International)
- Multiple Criteria Decision Making (McGraw-Hill)
- Linear Multiobjective Programming (Springer-Verlag)
- Autopoiesis, Dissipative Structures and Spontaneous Social Orders (Westview Press)
- MCDM-Past Decades and Future Trends (JAI Press)
- Autopoiesis: A Theory of the Living Organization (Elsevier North Holland)
- Uncertain Prospects Ranking and Portfolio Analysis (Verlag Anton Hain)
- Multiple Criteria Decision Making (University of South Carolina Press)
- Multiple Criteria Decision Making: Kyoto 1975 (Springer-Verlag)

His books in Czech include:

- Cesty k úspěchu (Roads to Success),
- Neučte se z vlastních chyb (Do not Learn from your Own Mistakes),
- Hledání vlastní cesty (Searching for your Own Way),
- Všechno bude jinak (Everything will be Different),
- To vám byl divný svět (What a Strange World it was) and some others.
