= Renée Mauborgne =

American business theorist

Renée Mauborgne (born 1963) is an American economist and business theorist. She is a professor of strategy at INSEAD, a business school based in France. Mauborgne is also the co-director of the Fontainebleau-based INSEAD Blue Ocean Strategy Institute. She is known as co-author of the 2005 book Blue Ocean Strategy.

== Career ==
Renée Mauborgne had studied and taught at the Ross School of Business, University of Michigan, before joining INSEAD. Mauborgne is a INSEAD distinguished fellow.

== Publications ==
=== Books ===
Mauborgne has published three books and numerous articles on strategic management of multinational corporations.

- 2005: Blue Ocean Strategy. How to Create Uncontested Market Space and Make the Competition Irrelevant. With W. Chan Kim. Boston, Massachusetts: Harvard Business School Press.
- 2017: Blue Ocean Shift. Beyond Competing. With W. Chan Kim. New York: Hachette Books
- 2023: Beyond Disruption, with W. Chan Kim. Harvard Business School Press

=== Articles ===
- Kim, W. Chan, and Renee A. Mauborgne. "Procedural justice, attitudes, and subsidiary top management compliance with multinationals" corporate strategic decisions." Academy of management journal 36.3 (1993): 502-526.
- Kim, W. Chan, and Renée Mauborgne. "Value innovation." Harvard Business Review 1 (1997).
- Kim, W. Chan, and Renée Mauborgne. "Strategy, value innovation, and the knowledge economy." Sloan management review 40 (1999): 41–54.
