= Jane Clayson Johnson =

American journalist and author (born 1967)

Jane Clayson Johnson (born April 25, 1967) is an American journalist and author who rose to national prominence as co-host of a network morning news program and covered stories for CBS News, ABC News, and WBUR/NPR.

== Early life and career ==
Clayson was born in Salt Lake City, Utah, and lived in Boston; Aberdeen, Scotland; Nashville; and Seattle during her early childhood. She attended Sacramento Country Day School and graduated from Rio Americano High School in Sacramento, California. She is an accomplished violinist and played with the Sacramento Youth Symphony, traveling with them to the International Youth and Music Festival in Vienna, Austria, where they placed 2nd among youth symphonies worldwide.

Clayson is the eldest of three children. In 1985, her brother David died of a brain tumor. Her father was a vascular surgeon in the Sacramento area for over four decades and her mother was a homemaker who also served as president of the Board of the Sacramento Youth Symphony, and as a member of the Sacramento Symphony Board.

Clayson attended Brigham Young University (BYU) in Provo, Utah on a violin performance scholarship and graduated in 1990 with a degree in journalism. She was given the Earl J. Glade Award as the outstanding student in her program. She placed in the Top 10 in the national William Randolph Hearst Journalism Award for most promising college students in journalism. She is also the recipient of an honorary doctorate degree from Utah State University.

She began her career at KSL-TV in Salt Lake City, Utah (1990–96). While at KSL, she won multiple awards from the Society of Professional Journalists. She traveled to China to write and produce Faces of Hope, a documentary and series of stories about American doctors providing life-changing care to Chinese children with disabilities. Her work there earned a regional Emmy. She also received the Radio and Television News Directors of America's Edward R. Murrow Award while at KSL.

== ABC News ==
In 1996, Clayson moved to Los Angeles, California, where she began her network news career at ABC News as a correspondent for Good Morning America, World News Tonight with Peter Jennings, and other broadcasts, including Nightline with Ted Koppel. Her work included coverage of breaking news, the presidential campaigns of Bob Dole (1996) and George W. Bush (2000), and the O.J. Simpson civil trial. For ABC's affiliate news service, NewsOne, she reported on major events such as the Atlanta Olympic Park bombing and the crash of TWA Flight 800. On overseas assignments, she covered the crash of Korean Air 747 in Guam, NATO's strikes against Kosovo and the resulting refugee crisis in Macedonia and, in Indonesia, the riots that led to the fall from power of the dictator Suharto.

== The Early Show, CBS News ==
On November 1, 1999, Clayson joined Bryant Gumbel for the debut broadcast of CBS' The Early Show. From 1999 to 2002, she anchored The Early Show through the new millennium, the inauguration of President George W. Bush, and she was on the air for the terrorist attacks of September 11, 2001. During the subsequent days and weeks she co-anchored continuous coverage of the attacks on The Early Show and co-anchored live coverage with Dan Rather at Ground Zero in New York City.

In 2002, Clayson became a correspondent for CBS News. She regularly reported for Eye on America segments and contributed to both 48 Hours and CBS Evening News, substituting as anchor on the CBS Evening News with Dan Rather, CBS Evening News weekend editions and was a contributor to 48 Hours.

== WBUR in Boston, and NPR ==
From 2006 to 2020, Clayson was the primary fill-in on the public radio program On Point, produced by WBUR in Boston and syndicated by NPR, when the regular hosts were absent. In 2020, she began hosting Here & Now, also produced at WBUR and syndicated by NPR. She hosted WBUR's Radio Boston for two years. She has produced specials for the Discovery Channel. She also hosted BYUtv's coverage of the funeral for Gordon B. Hinckley, president of the Church of Jesus Christ of Latter-day Saints (LDS Church), on February 2, 2008.

Over the course of her career, Clayson has interviewed U.S. Presidents and First Ladies, an array of other American political leaders, as well as other heads of state, authors, scientists, numerous celebrities from Hollywood and the Broadway stage, and she grilled Martha Stewart shortly prior to her indictment, conviction, and imprisonment for securities fraud. She has presented awards at events such as the Academy of Country Music Awards in Los Angeles and at the Grand Ole Opry in Nashville. In 2000, she appeared on The Late Show with David Letterman.

Clayson has received numerous journalism awards, including The Edward R. Murrow Award from the Radio and Television News Directors Association of America, an Emmy Award, and several Society of Professional Journalists Awards. She is a sought-after speaker and host of special media events as diverse as 9/11 Coming Together, a 20th anniversary commemoration of the terrorist attacks of September 11, 2001, and the Children's Miracle Network national telethon.

== Personal life ==
In September 2003, Clayson married Mark W. Johnson, a graduate of the U.S. Naval Academy, Columbia University (with a master's degree in civil engineering and engineering mechanics) and Harvard Business School. He is cofounder with Clayton M. Christensen of management consulting firm, Innosight. The couple were first introduced to each other by Clayson's sister, Hannah Clayson Smith. Mark Johnson had joined the LDS Church, of which Clayson was already a member, not long before they first met. Clayson left CBS three months later (December 2003) to join her husband in Boston.

The couple have two children, and have also raised three children from his previous marriage.

== Books ==
Clayson's first book, I Am a Mother, was released in March 2007 and chronicles her decision to leave the network news business to have a family. Her second book, Silent Souls Weeping, released in 2019, is a candid look at clinical depression, featuring dozens of first-person stories about the experience and impact of mental illness. Clayson regularly speaks to audiences around the country about mental health awareness. Silent Souls Weeping received the 2019 Literary Award from LDS Publishing and Media--Best Self-Help/Resource.
