= Mark W. Johnson =

American author; co-founder of Innosight

- Occupation: Author
- Years active: 2000
- Organization: Innosight
- Spouse: Jane Clayson Johnson (m. 2003)
- Children: 5 (3 from previous marriage)

Mark W. Johnson is co-founder and senior partner at Innosight, a growth strategy consulting firm, which he co-founded with Clayton Christensen in 2000.

Johnson has written on growth strategy and is associated with the concept of "future-back" strategy development. He is the coauthor of Lead from the Future: How to Turn Visionary Thinking into Breakthrough Growth (2020), the author of Reinvent Your Business Model: How to Seize the White Space for Transformative Growth (2018), and the coauthor of Dual Transformation: How to Reposition Today's Business While Creating the Future (2017), all published by Harvard Business Review Press.

Johnson's work has focused on helping companies envision and create new growth strategies, manage transformation, and achieve renewal through business model innovation. This work is the subject of the McKinsey award-winning Harvard Business Review article, “Reinventing Your Business Model,” the business book Seizing the White Space: Business Model Innovation for Growth and Renewal, as well as his forthcoming book Dual Transformation: How to Reposition Today's Business and Create the Future, published by Harvard Business Press, 2017.

Prior to co-founding Innosight, Johnson was a consultant at Booz Allen Hamilton. Before that, he served as a nuclear power-trained surface warfare officer in the U.S. Navy.

Johnson received an MBA from the Harvard Business School, a master's degree in civil engineering and engineering mechanics from Columbia University, and a bachelor's degree in aerospace engineering from the United States Naval Academy. Johnson previously sat on the Board of the United States Naval Institute. He and his wife, Jane Clayson Johnson, and their children live in Belmont, Massachusetts.

== Journal articles ==
- Institutionalizing Innovation Anthony, Scott D.; Johnson, Mark W.; Sinfield, Joseph V. (January 2008), MIT Sloan Management Review.
- Reinventing Your Business Model Johnson, Mark W.; Christensen, Clayton M.; Kagermann, Henning (December 2008), Harvard Business Review.
- New Business Models in Emerging Markets Eyring, Matthew J.; Johnson, Mark W.; Nair, Hari (January 2011), Harvard Business Review.

== Books ==
- The Innovator's Guide to Growth: Putting Disruptive Innovation to Work Anthony, Scott D.; Johnson, Mark W.; Sinfield, Joseph V.; Altman, Elizabeth J. (2008), Boston, Massachusetts, USA: Harvard Business Review Press, ISBN 1591398460.
- Seizing the White Space: Business Model Innovation for Growth and Renewal Johnson, Mark W. (2010), Boston, Massachusetts, USA: Harvard Business Review Press, ISBN 1422124819.
- Dual Transformation: How to Reposition Today's Business and Create the Future Anthony, Scott D.; Gilbert, Clark; Johnson, Mark W. (2017), Boston, Massachusetts, USA: Harvard Business Review Press, ISBN 1633692485.
- Reinvent Your Business Model: How to Seize the White Space for Transformative Growth Johnson, Mark W. (2018), Boston, Massachusetts, USA: Harvard Business Review Press, ISBN 1633696464.
- Lead from the Future: How to Turn Visionary Thinking Into Breakthrough Growth Johnson, Mark W.; Suskewicz, Josh (2020), Boston, Massachusetts, USA: Harvard Business Review Press, ISBN 1633697541.
