= Community learning =

Community learning may refer to:

- Adult education
- Learning community
