= Academic league =

In Brazil, the academic leagues are associations of students of different years of medical graduation who seek to deepen their knowledge, orienting themselves according to the principles of the “university tripod”: teaching, research and extension. In general, the leagues are arranged into different areas, like neurology, trauma, oncology, pediatrics and cardiology.

The academic leagues have similarities to the learning communities found in American and Canadian universities. However, the academic leagues are small groups, with the students responsible for the organizing and planning processes, with the assistance of a teacher. The activities occur regularly throughout the curricular semester, usually in unusual schedules, involving students from different years and even from different medical universities. The academic leagues are frequently discussed in seminars and conferences, such as Brazilian Congress of Medical Education, which promote scientific development and enable the exchange of experience between peers. Although, there is no clear concept about them.

== Motivations and critics ==
They are extracurricular activities, so participation highlights the students' motivation to active pursuit of knowledge. The academic leagues have optional participation, being environments theoretically free of academic formalities, with a system of self-management of learning and have a mitigation of the classic hierarchical environment of the teacher-student relationship. Thus, it is understood that learning within them becomes more enjoyable. Some Brazilian authors, however, list critiques to the academic leagues. The possible subversion of the formal curricular structure, reproduction of academic defects, early specialization, the risk of the practice of medicine without guidance and supervision, and the emphasis on teaching and research to the detriment of university extension, reduced to specific campaigns and activities.

There are many motivations that lead students to participate in an academic league: need to approach clinical practice, deficiencies in the curriculum, search for social recognition, among others. Therefore, it is to be expected that there is immense variability among the academic leagues, showing that because it is a student initiative and based on an initial problem, each group of students finds ways to deal with such problems.

== Base-activities ==
Despite the variability, however, it is possible to note the base-activity pattern in the teaching-research-extension tripod. In general, all academic leagues have periodic programmed activities with the objective of discussing the subject of interest among the students, based on theoretical basis, in the form of classes, discussion of articles or seminars. Also, most of the leagues described participation in academic events, as listeners, lecturers or carrying out scientific papers.

== Health sciences ==
Although the academic leagues started and is still a theme predominantly related to the medical students, they have been created in other health sciences. Sometimes, academic leagues are created to "work around" problems of the curricula.

== Academic leagues entities ==
Some specialty societies stimulate the creation of academic leagues in their area, introducing content that are not yet on the formal curriculum, and creating networks of knowledge exchange among the leagues of their area. There are other experiences of entities that congregate several academic leagues, the most notable being the Brazilian Association of Academic Leagues, founded in 2006. There is also the Brazilian Committee of Trauma Leagues, which brings together the academic leagues focused on the study of trauma and emergency medicine.
