= University student retention =

University student retention, sometimes referred to as persistence, is a process to improve student graduation rates and decrease a loss of tuition revenue via university programs.

== Ireland ==
In Ireland, student retention is commonly discussed in terms of progression, completion and student success. The Higher Education Authority (HEA) tracks progression among first-time entrants to full-time undergraduate courses leading to major awards at NFQ levels 6, 7 and 8 and lasting two or more academic years. A student is deemed to have progressed if they are present in the same higher education institution in the following academic year, while a student is deemed to have transferred if they are recorded in another higher education institution in the following year.

For 2022/23 new entrants, the HEA reported that 87% progressed to the following academic year within their own institution. A further 2% were recorded as present in another institution in the following academic year, giving an overall retention/progression rate of 89% when transfers are included.

The HEA also reports completion rates. In its 2025 progression and completion report, the HEA stated that 78% of 2016/17 new entrants had gained an award by 2023. For new entrants from 2016/17 to 2018/19, 88% of those who progressed to the following year went on to gain an award.

Irish policy has increasingly framed retention within wider concepts of participation and student success. The National Access Plan 2022–2028 extends beyond access to higher education to include participation and student success, with an emphasis on inclusive, universally designed higher education environments and evidence-driven monitoring. In 2025, the HEA published a review of the Irish National Framework for Student Success in Higher Education, which recommended a renewed sector-wide understanding of student success extending beyond academic attainment to include wellbeing, personal development and readiness for employment and society.

== In United States ==
=== Transfer rates ===
Transfer rates are very high in the United States with 60% of all bachelor's degrees being awarded to students that began their college at another institution. Some transfers are planned; many community colleges have articulation agreements with four-year colleges. Other university systems are college-preparatory schools, which offer the first two years of the degree at a local campus with transfer into the flagship university in the junior year.

=== Factors affecting persistence ===
==== Grades ====
Grades earned in a student's first semester are a strong predictor of student persistence. In a Budny longitudinal study of Purdue engineering students, it was shown that first semester GPA was a better predictor of retention than SAT scores. In the study, first semester engineering students who earn an A grade in Precalculus have the same persistence after 6 semesters as students whose first semester mathematics course was Calculus I and who earned a B, and these levels of persistence are also equivalent to students whose first semester course was Calculus II, and who earned a grade of C. A second study on the role of grades in first semester coursework supports the importance of first semester GPA, showing that the grade earned in English and mathematics courses are a strong predictor of persistence after one year, with the strongest predictor of returning corresponding to earning a grade of "A" in English, and the next strongest predictors corresponding to earning a "B" in English, or an "A" or "B" in mathematics. The level of course taken (for example, whether Calculus I or Precalculus) is less of a predictor of persistence at university than the grade earned in the mathematics class taken. This consideration is important for students who might, for example, have earned a passing AP Calculus AB score of "3" (as opposed to a higher score). For STEM majors that rely on Calculus I as a prerequisite, (e.g. engineering, physics and chemistry majors), these students with an AP AB score of "3" might consider retaking Calculus I their first semester at university and earning a high grade while also solidifying their calculus knowledge, and then taking Calculus II in their second semester.

==== Cost of tuition ====
The economy also has a noticeable effect on retention rates. The cost of public and private institutions in the 1999–2000 school year, which includes tuition and on campus housing, averaged $7,302 and $20,277, respectively. After adjusting for inflation, this represented a 22% cost increase at public institutions and a 27% increase at private institutions for the 10-year period between the 1989–1990 and 1999–2000 academic years.

According to the National Center for Public Policy and Higher Education, tuition at a 4-year college represented 12% of the total income for families that fell into the lowest income bracket in 1980, and rose drastically to encompass 25% of their income by 2000. This has created an influx of part-time students and working students. In the undergraduate population, 50% of students describe themselves as working primarily to pay for their education at an average of 25 hours per week. This leaves working-class students little time to become involved on campus and actively participate in university life. According to the U.S. Department of Education, National Center for Educational Statistics, only 50% of those who enter higher education actually earn a bachelor's degree.

Depending on the university, there are resources in order to help those with financial issues, such as financial aid.

== Addressing student retention ==
Universities have several programs for students to enjoy campus life and to help them get engage on campus. This includes campus funded tutoring, freshman seminar courses, and student clubs.

Private corporations are looking into the business of student retention as a potential new field of revenue. This has led to problematic outsourcing strategies, such as the case of the University of Texas' system $10 million investment into the private company Myedu. Data on the amount of corporate lobbying addressed to the Board of Regents of State Universities is not available.

== See also ==
- Alexander Astin
- Vince Tinto, a noted theorist in the field
