= Collins Hall (Miami University) =

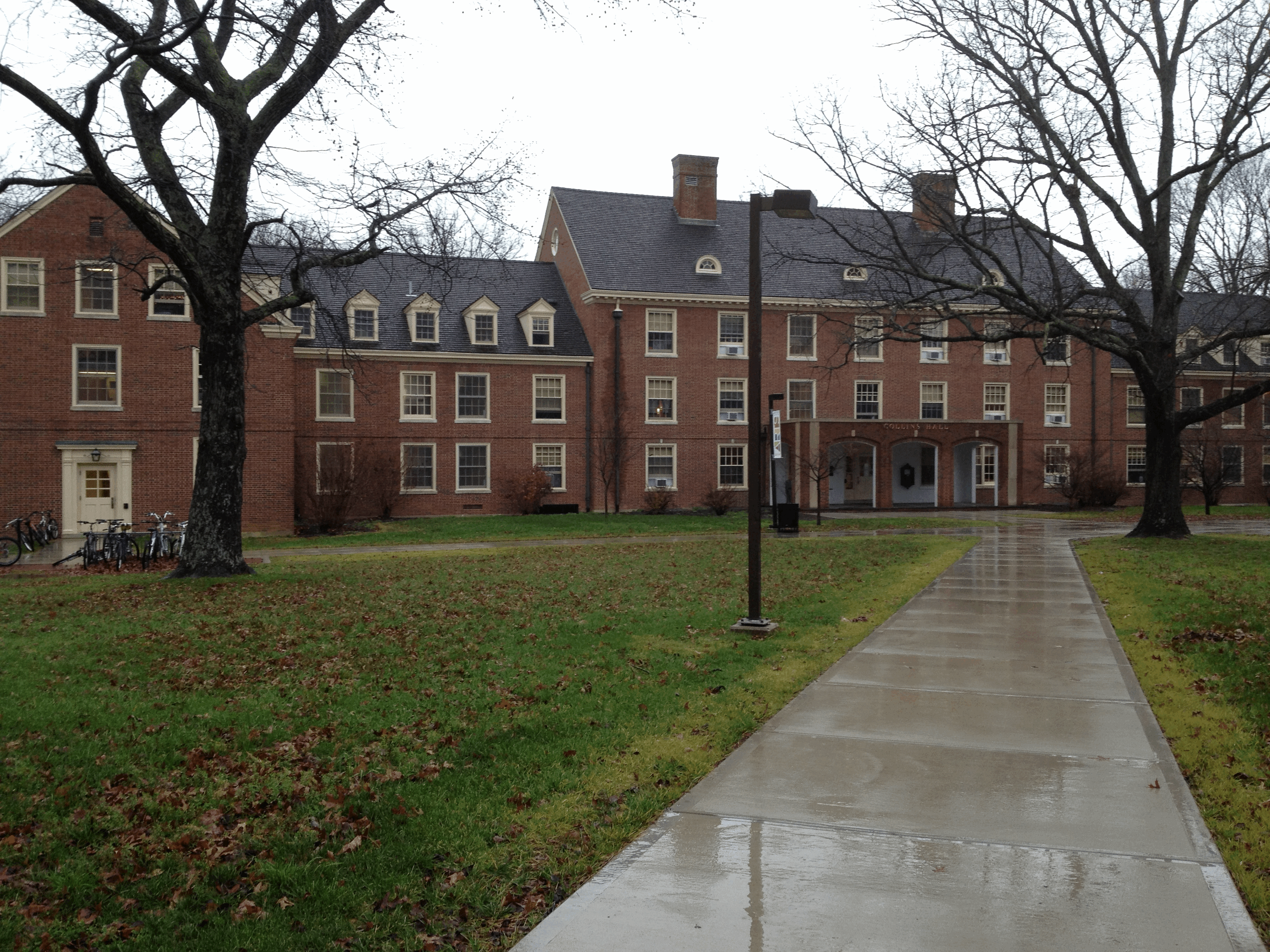

- Location within Ohio

General information
- Type: Dormitory
- Architectural style: Georgian
- Location: Oxford, Ohio, United States
- Coordinates: 39°30′41.72″N 84°43′37.17″W
- Cost: $703,000
- Owner: Miami University

Technical details
- Floor area: 37,144 sqft

Collins Hall is a residence hall at Miami University located on the eastern side of the university's main campus in Oxford, Ohio, United States. It has a 37,144 square feet and 436,000 cubic feet. It contains 3 floors plus a basement and has a maximum occupancy of 250 students. It is a coed dorm for freshmen and upperclassmen. Collins Hall is named after Joel Collins, who served at Miami University as a superintendent of grounds and college buildings and as secretary of the board of trustees.

== History ==
The construction of the west and central sections of Collins Hall began in 1952 at a cost of $565,000. The building was first occupied in January 1953 by freshman that had been living in temporary lodges located in the veteran's area of campus. The construction of the east wing began in 1955 at a cost of $138,000. Later that year, Collins Hall was completed, bringing the cost to a total of $703,000.

Collins Hall was originally built as a men's residence hall for freshmen students. It later became a coed residence hall for freshmen and upperclassmen. Women occupied the first and third floors and men occupied the second floor. The majority of students residing in Collins Hall were freshmen.

== Joel Collins ==
Collins Hall was named after Joel Collins in 1952. Joel Collins was born in Halifax County, Virginia on September 16, 1772. In 1779, his parents brought him to Kentucky. When he reached the age of 18, Joel became an Indian fighter. He learned lessons in warfare from Daniel Boone and Simon Kenton. In 1791, he joined General Charles Scott's Army, but was honorable discharged in the spring of 1792. He later became a sergeant, lieutenant, and captain in the Kentucky Militia and the United States Army.

In 1797, he became a judge in Lincoln County, Kentucky. He married Elizabeth Beeler, who had a brother living on Four Mile Creek near Oxford, Ohio. A few years later, Joel Collins moved his wife and family to Oxford Township. While residing in Oxford, Collins served as the first justice of the peace. He became a member of the Ohio House of Representatives and the Ohio Senate. In 1882, he was also appointed the secretary of the Miami University Board of Trustees. Collins soon became the most honorable citizen in Butler County and earned the name "Honorable Joel Collins" and "Honest Joel".

Joel Collins was a major contributor to Miami University. He surveyed and cleared land for several university buildings. Additionally, while serving on the Ohio State Legislature, Collins' vote prevented the university from being relocated to Cincinnati on several occasions. Collins is considered one of the five most influential people at the university before the American Civil War.

== Dorm life ==
Students in Collins Hall have the option of living in a single, double or triple room. Each room is equipped with a bed, dresser, desk, and closet and each student has access to a communal bathroom. The residence hall contains a living room, two pianos, a pool table, a TV room, a study lounge, a kitchen, and multiple vending machines. Collins Hall houses the Celebrate the Arts living learning community organized by the Residence Hall Association. Murals and artwork are featured on the walls throughout the building. Each month the living learning community holds a Coffee House, where students have the opportunity to perform in front of their peers. Many performances include singing, dancing, piano and guitar performances, as well as art exhibitions.
