= Glen Downey (writer) =

Canadian children's author and teacher

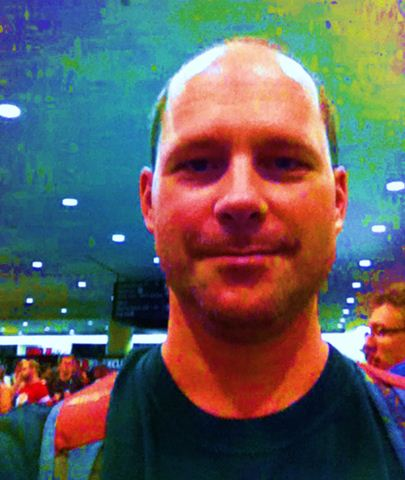
- Glen Downey at Toronto Fan Expo, 2012.
- Born: Glen Downey; October 15, 1969 (age 56); Hamilton, Ontario
- Education: B.A., M.A. (McMaster), Ph.D. (Victoria), B.Ed. (Western)
- Occupations: Children's Author, Teacher, Reviewer, Ludologist
- Writing career
- Language: English, French
- Period: 2002 - present
- Genre: Graphic Novel
- Notable work: Graphic Poetry
- Website: www.glendowney.ca

Glen Downey (born October 15, 1969) is a Canadian children's author, teacher, and academic from Oakville, Ontario. His publications include more than ninety books for young people across a variety of genres that focus specifically on the development of child and adolescent literacy and numeracy. Downey is best known as the series editor of Graphic Poetry, winner of both the 2010 "Texty" Award from the Text and Academic Authors Association, and the 2011 Teachers' Choice Award for Children's Books from Learning magazine. Downey came up with the concept for Graphic Poetry as a way of making poetry engaging for 21st century readers. Several of Downey's books are for award-winning educational series developed by Rubicon Publishing. These include Boldprint, The 10, Boldprint Graphic Readers, and Boldprint Graphic Novels.

== Biography ==
Downey was born in Hamilton, Ontario, and from an early age took an interest in reading. Although he was routinely encouraged by teachers to read books that would challenge him, Downey's formative reading consisted almost exclusively of comic books, Choose Your Own Adventure novels, Fighting Fantasy gamebooks, and the manuals and rulebooks of fantasy and science-fiction role-playing games, specifically Dungeons & Dragons and BattleTech.

Downey's interest in games eventually served to direct the course of his education. He received his B.A. from McMaster University in 1991, and his M.A. a year later, writing his Masters’ Thesis on the chess problem in Lewis Carroll's Through the Looking-Glass. He earned a Ph.D. in English from the University of Victoria in 1998, expanding on his previous graduate work in examining the development of the chess motif in the Victorian novel.

After teaching at both the University of Victoria and the University of British Columbia, where he won the Ian Fairclough Prize for Teaching in 2000, Downey left to pursue a B.Ed. in English and Mathematics Education at the University of Western Ontario’s Althouse College. While in the program, he submitted the manuscript for his first book, The Fifty Fatal Flaws of Essay Writing, which Althouse published in 2002. Since then, he has held a variety of teaching and administrative positions at public and private institutions, and has taught courses in Children’s Literature and Twenty-First Century Literacies in the graduate education program at the Ontario Institute for Studies in Education.

== Children’s writing ==
Downey’s interest in writing for children and young adults was motivated by his own formative reading experiences. He was introduced to Rubicon by David Boyd while the two were colleagues at Appleby College. Downey’s first book for Rubicon was Games for the award-winning Boldprint series. His most prolific year to date was 2009, with 47 books published across three different series. Recent work includes the Rubicon/Oxford series, Interface, a combination of texts and online platforms designed to "help students build the skills of critical inquiry."

== Works ==
=== Boldprint ===
- Games (2004)
- Images of war (2004)
- Famous Trials (2004)
- Medieval Warfare (2006), with Jayn Arnold
- Motorbikes (2006), with Mark Treleaven
- Suspense (2007)

=== Timeline ===
- Fire Mountain (2006), illustrated by Liam Thurston
- Rebel Prince (2006), illustrated by David Okum
- Gladiator (2006), illustrated by Andrew Barr
- Escape from East Berlin (2007), illustrated by Leo Lingas
- Ice Journey (2006), illustrated by Glenn Brucker
- Freedom Train (2007), illustrated by Leigh Dragoon
- The Great Siege (2007), illustrated by Mike Rooth
- Master Leonardo (2007), with Jayn Arnold, illustrated by Mike Rooth
- Miracle Men (2007), illustrated by Anthony Brennan

=== The 10 ===
- Most Remarkable Writers (2007), with Jayn Arnold
- Deadliest Military Inventions (2007)
- Greatest Sports Showdowns (2007)
- Worst Sports Scandals (2007)
- Greatest Hockey Teams (2007), with Kirsten Tenebaum
- Coolest Ways to Fly (2007), with Sandie Cond
- Hottest Hollywood Cars (2007), with Maria Malara
- Most Extreme Jobs (2007)
- Most Significant Documents (2007)
- Most Unforgettable Moments in NASCAR (2007)
- Most Memorable TV Moments (2007)
- Smartest Animals (2007)
- Most Decisive Battles (2007)

=== Graphic Poetry ===
- Paul Revere's Ride (2009), illustrated by Mike Rooth
- The Eagle / The Kraken (2009), illustrated by Jeremy Bennison
- The Wreck of the Edmund Fitzgerald (2009), illustrated by Jeremy Bennison
- Mother to Son / Harlem Night Song (2009), illustrated by Martin Wittfooth
- Same Song / Maestro (2009), illustrated by Louise Ferguson
- Colonel Fazackerley Butterworth Toast (2009), illustrated by Mike Rooth
- This is a Photograph of Me / Girl and Horse, 1928 (2009), Alan Cook
- The March of the Dead (2009), illustrated by Mike Rooth
- The Woman I Am in My Dreams / Now I See You (2009), illustrated by Daisy Chan
- Southbound on the Freeway / Water Picture (2009), illustrated by Robin Joseph
- The Cremation of Sam McGee (2009), illustrated by Francesco Francavilla
- Life Doesn't Frighten Me / Alone (2009), illustrated by Darcy Muenchrath
- The Shark / Sea-Gulls (2009), illustrated by Jeremy Bennison
- The Choice / Song for an April Dusk (2009), illustrated by Jenn Manley Lee
- Flight of the Roller Coaster / Lake of Bays (2009), illustrated by Gavin McCarthy
- The Circle Game (2009), illustrated by Nataly Kim
- What Do I Remember of the Evacuation? (2009), illustrated by Tyler Jenkins
- Oranges / Ode to Family Photographs (2009), illustrated by Hilary Jenkins
- I am a Canadian (2009)
- Hurricane / Childhood Tracks (2009), illustrated by Bruce Roberts
- I Shall Wait and Wait (2009), illustrated by Anne Marie Bourgeois

=== Boldprint Graphic Novels ===
- A Goblin's Tale (2009), illustrated by Andrew Barr
- Nemesis (2009), illustrated by Robert Deas
- Spirits of the Mountain (2009), illustrated by Zsolt Mato
- Ghost House (2009), with Jayn Arnold, illustrated by Scott Lincoln
- Snake Girl (2009), illustrated by Andrew Barr
- Final Voyage (2009), illustrated by John Lucas

=== Boldprint Graphic Readers ===
- Party Time (2009), illustrated by Franfou
- Pets Welcome (2009), illustrated by Zsolt Mato
- Hanging Ten (2009), illustrated by Pascal Campion
- Sir Henry and the Dragon (2009), illustrated by Jason MacKay
- The Sun (2009), illustrated by Daisy Chan
- Penguins on Parade (2009), illustrated by Zsolt Mato
- What's the Problem? (2009), illustrated by Stephen Daymond
- Shaping Up (2009), illustrated by Mike Rooth
- Hoop Shot (2009), illustrated by Michelle Draycott
- Fish Food (2009), illustrated by Bernard Joaquin
- The Legend of Wountie (2009), illustrated by Katie Cusak
- Whiz Kid (2009), illustrated by Miklos Weigert and Zsolt Mato
- Now You See Me (2009), illustrated by John Lucas
- Nature's Story (2009), illustrated by Ken Turner
- Gobble! Gobble! (2009), illustrated by Ron Sutton
- Westward Ho! (2009), illustrated by Hilary Jenkins
- The Gamers (2009), illustrated by Anthony Tan and Katrina Hao
- Built to Last (2009), illustrated by Bernard Joaquin
- Then and Now (2009), illustrated by Francesco Francavilla
- The Junkyard (2009), illustrated by Karen Roy

=== The 10 Discovery ===
- Most Outstanding Canadian Immigrants (2012), with Anita Griffith
- Most Important Decisions in Canadian History (2012)
- Greatest Early Civilizations (2012), with Nigel Samuel
- Best Superfoods (2012)
- Coolest Everyday Inventions (2012)
- Most Incredible High-Tech Vehicles (2012)
- Most Unforgettable Olympic Medalists (2012)
- Unluckiest Teams in Sports (2012)

=== Remix ===
- Passport to Adventure (2012)
- World of Wonders (2012)
- Fuelling the Future (2012)

=== Issues 21 ===
- Digital World (2014)
- Violence in the Media (2014)
- Censorship (2014)

=== Boldprint Inquiry ===
- After the Fire (2020), illustrated by Christian Amiel Miranda
- Gulliver in Lilliput (2020), illustrated by Bailie Rosenlund
- Orion (2020), illustrated by Chris Henderson
- Community Heroes (2020)
- Inspiring Kids (2020)
- Animal Heroes (2020)

=== Other works ===
- The Fifty Fatal Flaws of Essay Writing (2002)
- The 10 Essential Ways to Teach Students with Inquiring Minds (2008)
- Legendary Tales (2010)
- Interface Vol 1.2 with Carolyn Craven, Lori Lisi, et al. (2010)
- Interface Vol 2.2 with Carolyn Craven, Lori Lisi, et al. (2010)
- The Booksmart Detective Agency, Vol. 1 -- Into the Fire (2012)

== Awards ==
Downey's books have been part of series that have won the following awards:

Award	Series
2014 Moonbeam Children's Books (Gold) Award	Issues 21
2011 "Texty" Award	Interface
2011 TCA for Children's Books	Graphic Poetry; Boldprint Graphic Novels
2010 "Texty" Award	Graphic Poetry; Boldprint Graphic Novels; Boldprint Graphic Readers
2009 TCA for Children's Books	The 10
2009 TCA for Classroom Magazines	Boldprint
