= The Strategy Paradox =

- Cover of The Strategy Paradox
- Author: Michael E. Raynor
- Language: English
- Genre: Business & Economics Management
- Publisher: Doubleday
- Publication date: 2007
- Publication place: United States
- Pages: 320 pp
- ISBN: 978-0-385-51622-8 (0-385-51622-3)
- OCLC: 70778348
- Dewey Decimal: 658.4/012 22
- LC Class: HD30.28 .R384 2007

The Strategy Paradox is a business strategy book by author Michael E. Raynor, who is the Distinguished Fellow with Deloitte Research. The Strategy Paradox was published in 2007 by Currency/Doubleday. It was named a top ten book of 2007 by BusinessWeek, and a top five strategy book of 2007 by Strategy+Business.

== Synopsis ==
The Strategy Paradox, the title and focus of the book sets up a ubiquitous but little-understood tradeoff. The tradeoff is that most strategies are built on specific beliefs about an unpredictable future, but current strategic approaches force leaders to commit to an inflexible strategy regardless of how the future might unfold. It is this commitment to uncertainty that is the cause of "the strategy paradox."

== Reviews ==
- National Post With the right strategy, you can take big risks and win. By John Worsley Simpson, Financial Post
- BusinessWeek Sidstepping Disaster. By Dean Foust
- The Financial Times Take a strategic risk but hedge your bets. By Fergal Byrne
- Boston Globe For CEOs, admitting uncertainty can be the key to success. By Robert Weisman
- Harvard Business Review By Anand P. Raman
