= Adolescent literacy =

Ability of adolescents to read and write

Adolescent literacy refers to the ability of adolescents to read and write. Adolescence is a period of rapid psychological and neurological development, during which children develop morally (truly understanding the consequences of their actions), cognitively (problem-solving, reasoning, remembering), and socially (responding to feelings, interacting, cooperating). All of these three types of development have influence—to varying degrees—on the development of literacy skills.

Adolescent literacy development can take many different forms at home and in school. Parental involvement is extremely important and has a positive effect on a child's developing literacy skills. Schools implement many different strategies to optimize a student's literacy development such as after-school tutoring, school-wide literacy reform models, and supporting families of students struggling with literacy skills.

== Overview ==
The International Reading Association (IRA) notes the unique psychology and neurology of adolescents, distinct from the literacy development of younger children or adults. They indicate seven guiding principles of literacy development for this age group, required for adolescents to become motivated, lifelong readers:

- access to a wide variety of reading material calibrated to their interests
- instruction that builds and develops their reading skills and interest in reading towards increasingly complex texts
- assessment that highlights both strengths and needs
- expert teachers who model and provide explicit instruction across the curriculum
- support from reading specialists (for those students experiencing difficulty learning)
- teachers who understand the complexities of individual adolescent readers
- homes, communities, and a nation that support the needs of adolescent learners

== Development ==
Literacy development begins at a young age, and the exact way it occurs will effect individuals into adulthood. The first three years of schooling are the most impactful on a child's literacy skills and fluency. Memory tasks developed in the first three years of primary school are important to the process of literacy development. These tasks include remembering lists, digits forwards and backwards, and short stories. The abilities developed in the first three years of schooling are important to developing literacy skills soon after.

Literacy development in schools can be implemented with other subjects to maximize the effectiveness of the teachings. Reading and writing mutually reinforce one another and developing skills in either can benefit literacy skills overall. Classrooms that integrate both writing and reading instruction more regularly than others produce more developed literacy skills. Some schools in the United States are implementing science-literacy implementation as a coupled instruction. Students involved in this kind of literacy instruction have outperformed students receiving separated language and science instruction.

The importance of literacy in society today can be reflected in the sheer amount of different strategies being implemented in schools and after-school programs with regards to literacy. Non-profit organizations, such as Reading Partners, work to aid students in their literacy development journey through outside tutoring supplemental to literacy teachings in school. Volunteer tutors work to bring young students literacy levels up through personalized reading and writing tutoring. Some schools in the United States implement school-wide literacy reform models to undergo a systematic approach to literacy development. Literacy reform models can include universal professional development for teachers, universal literacy materials and teaching strategies, as well as trained literacy coaches for the whole school. Systematic literacy reform models have proven to be effective in large urban school districts.

Adolescent literacy development practices can also deeply involve parents and guardians. Some solutions to adolescent illiteracy range from teaching parents of students in high poverty schools how to book-read with their children, to encouraging parents to participate in their children's schooling by attending family-fluency workshops. Overall, the strategies that involve parental involvement and home practices have positive effects on students and their families.

In the United States, literacy skills are closely related to educational attainment and quality of life. Literacy is a key predictor of future educational success and happiness. Illiteracy shares a close relation with unemployment in adulthood.

== See also ==
- List of books written by children or teenagers
- Young adult fiction
- Young adult romance literature
