= Michael E. Raynor =

Canadian writer

- Born: 28 June 1967 (age 59); Brantford, Ontario
- Occupations: Author, researcher, consultant
- Website: https://michaelraynor.com

Michael E. Raynor (born June 28, 1967) is a Canadian writer and an expert on business management practices.

== Biography ==
Raynor was born in Brantford, Ontario, attended Appleby College in Oakville, Ontario, and holds an undergraduate degree in Philosophy from Harvard College (1990) in Cambridge, MA, where he graduated magna cum laude.

During the course of his undergraduate career he was a Detur Prize winner (first year academic excellence) and a John Harvard Scholar (continued academic excellence). His honors thesis examined the metaphysics of personal identity.

He has an MBA (1994) from the Richard Ivey School of Business in London, Ontario where he was awarded the Nelson M. Davis Memorial Scholarship. He earned his Doctorate in Business Administration (DBA) from the Harvard Business School (2000), where he was a Dively Award winner for research excellence.

Raynor’s first book, co-authored with Clayton M. Christensen, The Innovator's Solution, was a bestseller published in 2003. The primary focus of the book was on creating and sustaining successful growth. Raynor’s second book, The Strategy Paradox (ISBN 978-0-385-51622-8), was published by Currency/Doubleday in February 2007.. Raynor’s third book, The Innovator’s Manifesto, was published by Crown Business in August 2011.. This book presents specific data and analysis that demonstrates the predictive power of Disruption theory. Raynor's fourth book, The Three Rules: How Exceptional Companies Think, was published by Portfolio in May 2013. Michael E. Raynor and Mumtaz Ahmed analyzed data on more than 25,000 companies spanning forty-five years. Their five-year study began with a sophisticated statistical analysis to identify which companies have truly exceptional performance, 344 in all.

== Select publications ==
- Clayton M. Christensen, Michael. E. Raynor and R. MacDonald (2015). “What is Disruptive Innovation?” Harvard Business Review 93(12).
- Raynor, Michael E. and Mumtaz Ahmed (2013). The Three Rules: How Exceptional Companies Think. Portfolio.
- Raynor, Michael E. and Mumtaz Ahmed (2013). "Three Rules for Making a Company Truly Great." Harvard Business Review. Vol. 91(4).
- Raynor, M. E. (2011). The Innovator’s Manifesto: Deliberate Disruption for Transformational Growth. Crown Business.
- Raynor, M. E. (2007). The Strategy Paradox: Why Committing to Success Leads to Failure (And What to Do About It). Currency/Doubleday.
- Raynor, M. E. (2005). "Strategic Flexibility: Corporate-level Real Options as a Response to Uncertainty in the Pursuit of Strategic Integration." In Bower, Joseph L., and Clark Gilbert, eds., From Resource Allocation to Strategy. UK: Oxford University Press. Chapter 14.
- Raynor, Michael E. and Howard S. Weinberg (2004). "Beyond Market Segmentation." Marketing Management. Vol. 13(6), pp. 22–29.
- Allen, Dwight L. Jr. and Michael E. Raynor (2004). "Preparing for a new global business environment: Divided and disorderly or integrated and harmonious?" Journal of Business Strategy Vol. 25(5), pp. 16–25.
- Goodfellow, James L. and Michael E. Raynor (2004). "Managing Strategic Risk: A New Partnership Between the Board and Management, " Strategy and Leadership, Vol. 32(5), pp. 45–47.
- Raynor, Michael E. (2004). "The Regulator's Dilemma: Protecting the Public Welfare Versus Serving the Public Interest," Regulatory Affairs FOCUS Vol. 9(7), August, pp. 32–37.
- — (2004) [In German, translated from the English]. "Verbessern oder Erfinden? Innovationen im Lebenszyklus eines Produktes." In Innovationen: Versprechen an die Zukunft, Thomas Ganswindt (ed.). pp. 63–84.
- — (2004). "Strategic Flexibility: Taking the Fork in the Road". Competitive Intelligence, Vol. 7(1), pp. 6–13.
- Christensen, Clayton M. and Michael E. Raynor (2003). "Why Hard-Nosed Executives Should Care About Management Theory." Harvard Business Review Vol. 81(9).
- Raynor, Michael E. (2002). "Diversification as Real Options and the Implications on Firm-Specific Risk and Performance." The Engineering Economist. Vol. 47(4).
- Christensen, Clayton M., Michael E. Raynor and Matt Verlinden (2001). "Skate to Where the Money Will Be." Harvard Business Review Vol. 79(10).
- Raynor, Michael E. and Joseph L. Bower (2001). "Lead from the Center: The Key to Managing Divisions in Turbulent Times." Harvard Business Review. Vol. 79(5).
- Raynor, Michael E. (2000). "Tracking Stocks and the Exercise of Real Options." Journal of Applied Corporate Finance. Vol. 13(2).
- — (2000). "Hidden in Plain Sight: Hybrid Diversification, Economic Performance", and "Real Options" in Corporate Strategy. In Winning Strategy in a Deconstructing World. R. Bresser, D. Heubal, M. Hitt and R. Nixon. London, John Wiley & Sons: Chapter 4.

== See also ==
- Disruptive technology
