= St. Mildred's-Lightbourn School =

Location
- 1080 Linbrook Road; Oakville, Ontario, L6J 2L1; Canada; 43.46475°N 79.66829°W

Information
- School type: Independent
- Religious affiliation: Anglican
- Founded: 1891
- Principal: Catherine Hant
- Grades: JK-12
- Language: English
- Colours: Navy, red, and white
- Mascot: Spartans
- Website: www.smls.on.ca
- Last updated: October 21, 2024

St. Mildred's-Lightbourn School (commonly abbreviated to SMLS) is an independent all-girls school in Oakville, Ontario, Canada with approximately 510 students from Junior Kindergarten to Grade 12. The Junior School includes girls from JK to grade five. The Middle School includes grade 6, 7, and 8. The Senior School goes from grade 9 to grade 12.

== History ==
St. Mildred's-Lightbourn School was founded by a community of Sisters, who had traveled to Canada from various parts of England. It was first opened in Toronto as St. Mildred's College, in September 1908. In 1923, Appleby College Headmaster, John Guest, requested for Ruth Lightbourn, who was staying at her parents' house, to teach his two daughters. Parents continued to ask for Miss Lightbourn's help with their children, and soon enough there was no space left for her to do her job. She continued teaching young children from well-to-do families, in an expanded area, for thirty-seven years later.

In 1964, the Lightbourn School Board of Governors asked the Community of the Sisters of the Church to manage their school, and five years later Lightbourn School was expanded, and united as St. Mildred's-Lightbourn School. The school was turned over by the Sisters to the Board of Governors in 1986.

== Culture ==
Students are divided into different houses upon arrival: Brant Massey, Grenfell Alexander and Cartier Vanier, whose symbols are a red and black beaver, a blue green flying moose and a green and black frog, respectively. The senior school mascot is currently a spartan after a movement to change the mascot from a pink bowed alligator wearing the school kilt called "Millie the Milligator"; she is still used frequently with the Junior School students. School songs include Jubilate Deo and Blessed are the Pure in Heart.

== Junior School ==
The junior school program spans from Junior Kindergarten to Grade 5. Academic programs include literacy, mathematics, science, social science, French, and religion, while the arts program consists of music and visual arts classes, as well as several performance opportunities. All junior school students participate in a physical education class, and students may join several extracurricular sports, such as hockey, soccer, swimming, frisbee, basketball, cross-country, and track and field.

== Middle School ==
The middle school program covers Grade 6 (MS6) to Grade 8 (MS8) and balances traditional core concept teaching with inquiry-based and project learning that integrates themes across multiple subject areas. Throughout the year, girls have the opportunity to participate in a variety of opportunities to test their academic abilities which, depending on the year, include challenges such as math contests, bridge building, the Spelling Bee of Canada, the CIS Junior Speech Competition, Kids Lit Quiz, music festivals, dance festivals, and more. There are also opportunities to reach ahead and take Grade 9 courses, for further challenge.

Students may travel locally, outside the province, and/or internationally through the Global Citizenship Department.

== Senior School ==
Throughout the senior school years, Grades 9 (SS9) to Grade 12 (SS12/Grad Year), girls have a teacher advisor as well as subject-specific teachers. and invited to explore a wide range of co-curricular opportunities. There are also several major social events, including grade dances, a semi formal, and father daughter/mother daughter dances.

In SS9 and SS10, two types of courses are offered: academic and open courses. Academic courses emphasize theory and abstract problems. Open courses are designed to prepare students for further study in certain subjects and to enrich their education generally.

In SS11 to Grad Year, university and college preparation courses and open courses are offered to prepare students for their post-secondary destinations.

Technology is integrated throughout curriculum in all subjects to continue education beginning in the junior and middle schools.

== See also ==
- Education in Ontario
- List of secondary schools in Ontario
