= Vince Tinto =

American academic

Vincent Tinto
- Education: University of Chicago (PhD); Rensselaer Polytechnic Institute (MS); Fordham University (BS)
- Occupations: Sociologist, education theorist
- Known for: Individual departure theory in higher education
- Notable work: Leaving College

Vincent Tinto is a Distinguished University Professor of sociology at Syracuse University's School of Education. He is a noted theorist in the field of higher education, particularly concerning student retention and learning communities.

== Education and career ==
Tinto received his Ph.D. in education and sociology from the University of Chicago after earning a Bachelor of Science in physics at Fordham University in 1963. He was chair of the higher education program at Syracuse from 1999 to 2006. His best known work is probably his heavily cited book, Leaving College (1993, 2nd Edition), published by the University of Chicago Press, in which he created a theory derived from the work of Emile Durkheim on suicide. This work compares such departure to the idea of leaving society (i.e., via suicide) due to a failure of the student and the campus to create a sense of belonging for the student.

His career has involved the conduct of research on higher education, particularly on student retention and the impact of learning communities on student growth and attainment. Tinto has served as a consultant to many federal and state agencies, independent research firms, foundations, and with two- and four-year institutions of higher education. He has also served on the editorial boards of several journals, organizations, and professional associations concerned with higher education.

In 1990 Tinto served as Associate Director of the six-million-dollar National Center on Postsecondary Teaching, Learning, and Assessment funded by the U.S. Office of Education. He has worked with the Council for Opportunity in Education, the Pell Institute for the Study of Opportunity in Education, the European Access Network, and the Graduate Record Examination Board. As a member of the Pathways to College Network, he is currently engaged in a national effort to increase access to college. Tinto is retired as of 2013 and no longer a Syracuse resident.

== Awards ==
- The Council of Independent Colleges 2008 Academic Leadership Award
- The National Institute for Staff Development International 2008 Leadership Award
- Distinguished Fellow in the Council of Learning Assistance and Developmental Education Associations
- Lumina Foundation for Education grant (2002)
- William and Flora Hewlett Foundation grant. (2006)

== Publications ==
=== Books ===
- Leaving College: Rethinking the Causes and Cures of Student Attrition. Chicago: University of Chicago Press. 1987, 2nd ed. 1993. ISBN 978-0-226-80449-1 According to Google Scholar, this has been cited 3415 times.
- Completing College: Rethinking Institutional Action. Chicago: The University of Chicago Press. 2012. ISBN 978-0-226-80452-1

=== Reports ===
- Moving Beyond Access: College Success for Low-Income, First-Generation Students (with Jennifer Engle). The Pell Institute for the Study of Opportunity in Higher Education. Washington D.C. 2008
- Student Retention and Graduation: Facing the Truth, Living with the Consequences. Occasional Paper No. 1. Pell Institute for the Study of Opportunity in Higher Education. Washington, D.C.. 2004
- "Adapting Learning Communities to the Needs of Remedial Education Students", NCPI, National Center for Postsecondary Improvement, Stanford University. 1998
- The Role of Financial Aid in the Persistence of Doctoral Students. (with Beatriz Chu Clewell). A final report for the National Science Foundation. Washington, D.C. 1999
- Building Learning Communities for New College Students (with A. Goodsell Love and P. Russo). A publication of the National Center on Postsecondary Teaching, Learning, and Assessment, Pennsylvania State University, 1994
- Collaborative Learning: A Sourcebook for Higher Education (with A. Goodsell and M. Maher), National Center on Postsecondary Teaching, Learning, and Assessment, Pennsylvania State University. 1992
- Education and Work: Differential Patterns of Occupational Attainment through Schooling. A final report to the National Institute of Education, Department of Education, Washington, D.C. 1980
- Assessment of a National Study of Special Service Programs in Higher Education. A report prepared for the Office of Planning, Budgeting and Evaluation, U.S. Office of Education, Washington, D.C. 1976
- The Effectiveness of Secondary and Higher Education Intervention Programs: A Critical Review of the Research. A report prepared for the Office of Planning, Budgeting and Evaluation, U.S. Office of Education, Washington, D.C.. 1974
- Dropout in Higher Education: A Review of Recent Research. A Report prepared for the Office of Planning, Budgeting and Evaluation, U.S. Office of Education, Washington, D.C.. 1973
- Where Colleges Are and Who Attends: Effects of Accessibility on College Attendance (with C.A. Anderson and Mary Jean Bowman) A general report prepared for the Carnegie commission on Higher Education. New York: McGraw-Hill Book Company. 1972
