= Alexis S. Troubetzkoy =

Writer on Russian history

Alexis Troubetzkoy
- Born: Alexis Sergeevich Troubetzkoy; March 6, 1934; Clamart, France
- Died: January 22, 2017 (aged 82); Toronto, Canada
- Occupations: Author, Educator
- Known for: Russian history

Alexis Sergeevich Troubetzkoy was an international author notable for his works on Russian history. He also served as the headmaster of Selwyn House School, Appleby College and the Toronto French School in Canada. He was born as a prince of the Trubetskoy family, to parents Prince Serge Grigorievich Troubetzkoy and Princess Lubov Alexeevna Obolensky. He taught at Bishop's College School and served in the Royal Canadian Navy for 8 years. He served as the executive director of the Tolstoy Foundation 1992–95. He also helped the International Orthodox Christian Charities gain the release of two of their workers taken hostage. His obituary in the Montreal Gazette mentioned among his published books Imperial Legend: the Disappearance of Tsar Alexander I; A brief history of the Crimean War; Arctic Obsession: the Lure of the Far North; The St. Petersburg Connection.

== Early years ==
Troubetzkoy graduated from Kent School, Concordia University and Bishop's University.
