= Innosight =

American consulting firm

Innosight is a strategy consultancy within Huron Consulting Group, advising global enterprises on business strategy, innovation, and growth transformation. Innosight was founded in 2000 by Harvard Business School professor Clayton M. Christensen and senior partner Mark W. Johnson. Innosight uses methods based on the concept of disruptive innovation, a theory defined by Christensen in his book The Innovator's Dilemma. The company headquarters is located in Boston, MA, with additional offices in Switzerland, Chicago, and New York. Andrew Waldeck is the practice's global managing partner.

In 2018, the company launched a new online platform called Innosight X.
