= Appleby College =

Location
- 540 Lakeshore Road West; Oakville, Ontario, L6K 3P1; Canada; 43.4262°N 79.6857°W

Information
- School type: Independent, Co-ed, Day/Boarding
- Motto: Nec temere, nec timide (Latin) (Neither rashly nor timidly)
- Founded: 1911 (115 years ago) (as Appleby School)
- Founder: Sir Byron Edmund Walker
- Oversight: Board of Governors
- Chairperson: Aubrey Baillie
- Grades: 7 to 12
- Enrollment: 803
- Campus: Suburban (Oakville): 60 acres Northern (Temagami): 11 acres
- Houses: Colley House, Powell's House, Baillie House, Walker House and Nightingale House (Middle School only)
- Colours: Light Blue and Dark Blue
- Mascot: Whippet (informally, Blue Dog)
- Endowment: $49 million
- Tuition: $35,900 – 71,700
- Website: www.appleby.on.ca

Appleby College is an international independent school (grades 7–12) located in Oakville, Ontario, Canada, founded in 1911 by John Guest, a former Headmaster of the Preparatory School at Upper Canada College. Guest dreamed of establishing a small boarding school in the country, and did so with the support and financial assistance of his father-in-law, Sir Byron Edmund Walker, a Canadian businessman. Today, Appleby is a co-educational day and boarding university-preparatory school, with a curriculum based around the liberal arts. It is situated on Lake Ontario in Oakville, Ontario, roughly 50 kilometres west of Toronto. Students are drawn primarily from Oakville, Burlington and Mississauga, but boarding students come from other parts of Canada and throughout all continents of the world.

Appleby is one of two Canadian members of the G30 Schools. It is also a member of the International Round Square Organisation and the Canadian Independent Schools Athletic Association. Appleby is accredited by the Canadian Educational Standards Institute.

== History ==
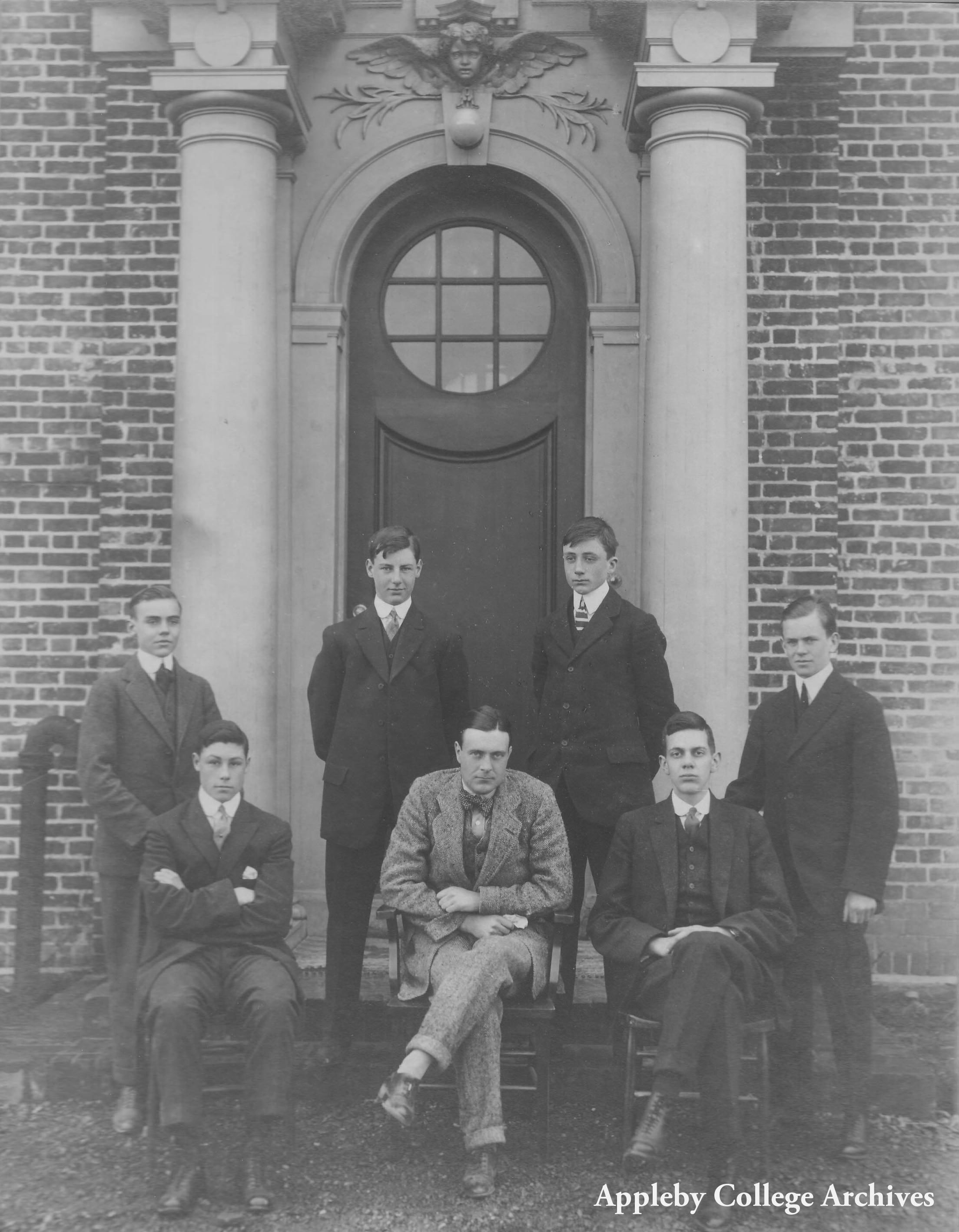
School prefects in 1912

Appleby School emblem, c. 1915

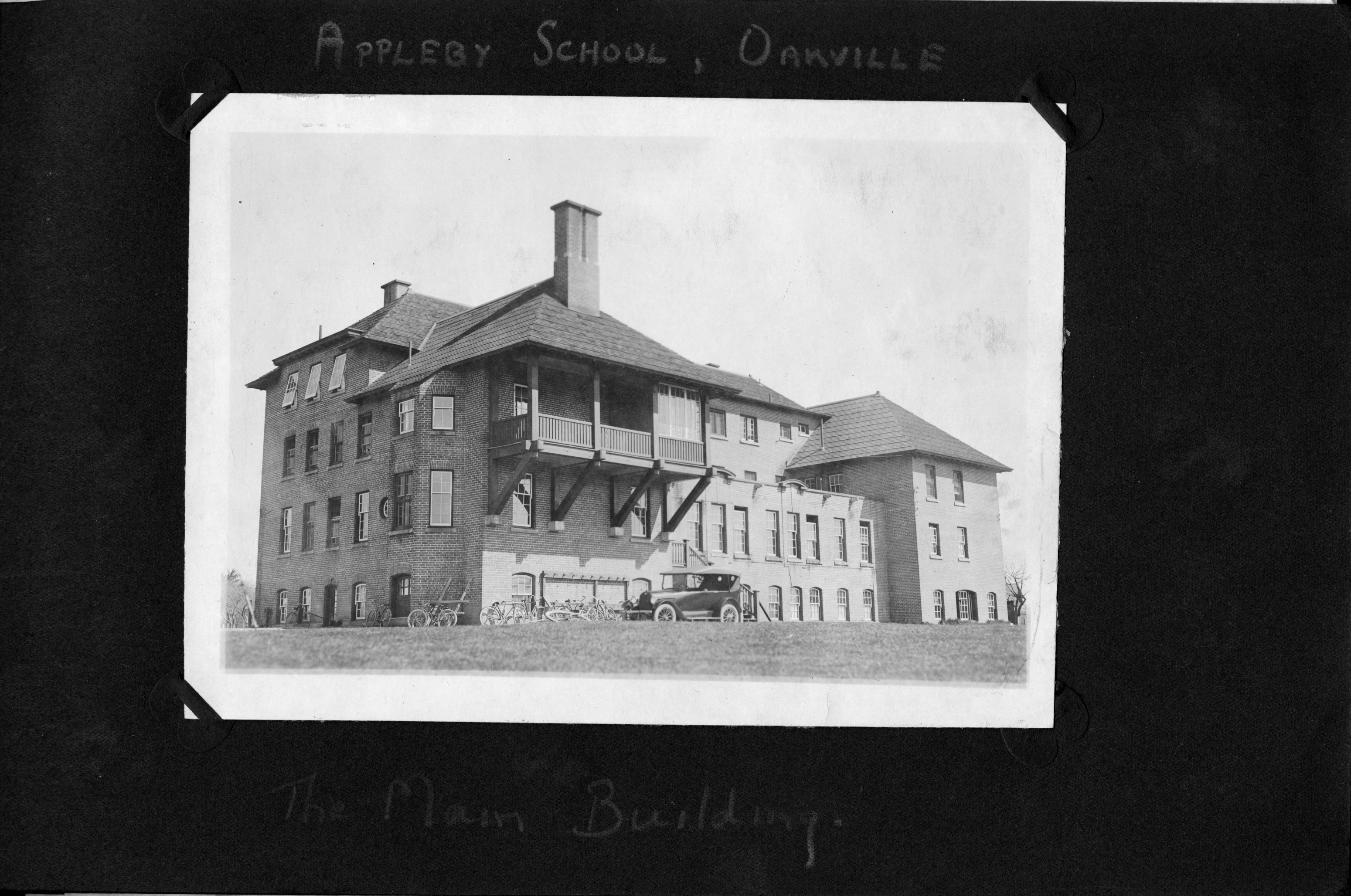
Photograph of School House (now Colley), c. 1925

- Originally called Appleby School when it opened in 1911 (the school had 29 students), it was renamed Appleby College in 1941.
- The first Argus (the school yearbook) was published in 1916.
- The school chapel was completed after seven years of construction, and dedicated in November 1929.
- Ferdinand Herbert Marani (architect) of Marani & Paisley designed several buildings on campus including: the gymnasium, swimming pool, administration building, and classroom building (1948–49)
- In 1956 the memorial entrance to the classroom building was completed, in commemoration of the Appleby boys and master who had been killed in World War I and World War II.
- Appleby marked its 50th anniversary in 1961 with a significant building expansion. A dining hall was built and named after John Guest, the founder and first headmaster. A third boarding residence, "New House" was opened, later renamed Walker House after the school's original benefactor.
- In 1968 the school chapel, formerly the Memorial Chapel, was expanded to its present size and renamed the John Bell Chapel in honour of the third headmaster, who retired that year. The first Appleby Quarterly, Appleby's alumni newsletter, was also published this year.
- In 1970 the swimming pool and J.S. Gairdner hockey arena were opened. Previously Appleby hockey was played at the Oakville Arena.
- In 1971 with enrollment rising, Appleby was split into a Junior and Senior School. Junior School consisted of grades 4 through 8. Previously the school had admitted boys as young as grade 1. Senior School consisted of grades 9 through 13.
- In 1973, Appleby introduced the innovative Northward Bound outdoor education program at the school's "Northern Campus" on Rabbitnose Island, Lake Temagami.
- In 1976, participation in the Senior School Cadet Corps became optional for students in grades 11 through 13. In 1984, it became a completely voluntary corps. Appleby maintained #440 Royal Canadian Army Cadet Corps for 93 years, until 2008, and it was open to both boys and girls.
- In 1979, the school cook, Hilda Chattaway, reached a remarkable milestone of 50 years of continuous service to Appleby. She continued to run the school's kitchen until her death in 1985. In 1982 the Junior School boarding dormitory located on the top floor of Colley House was named after her. However, boarding for the Junior grades was discontinued in 1990.
- September 1980 marked the first time day students outnumbered boarders
- Appleby commemorated its 75th anniversary during the 1985–1986 school year. Memorable events from that year included the first football team's undefeated season and first and only CISAA championship, and the visit of Lady Mountbatten to officially open the new wing to the classroom building. The new facility was called Nicholas Court and housed facilities for art, music and debating, in addition to new classrooms.
- Appleby was one of the first high schools in Ontario to eliminate Grade 13, moving to a four-year program with a "double cohort" graduating class in 1987. All high schools in Ontario moved from a five-year to a four-year program as of 2003.
- In 1990, Saturday classes were eliminated. Previously, a chapel service and classes were held on Saturday mornings and sports were played in the afternoon. Up until the 1970s, boarders had also attended a Sunday church service at St. Jude's Anglican Church in Oakville.
- Prior to becoming co-educational in 1991, Appleby was a school for boys only. Girls were admitted in grades 6 to 11. Before then, Appleby's sister school was St. Mildred's-Lightbourn School, an Oakville private school for girls. Appleby and St. Mildred's often collaborated in drama, for example.
- At the same time that girls were admitted, grades 4 through 6 were phased out, and the Junior School/ Senior School division was eliminated. Michael Nightingale was the Director of the Junior School for all twenty years that it existed.
- In 1993 Appleby saw its first co-educational graduating class. By that fall, the school had taken on its present character of a completely co-educational school for students in grades 7 through 12. A fourth boarding residence, Baillie House, was also built for female students.
- In 2011, Appleby celebrated its 100th anniversary.

== Boarding ==
As well as being a day school, boarding is offered from Grades 9 though 12 (7 and 8 can board but they live with faculty who live near campus) and there are numerous international students from over 20 countries attending Appleby. When the school first opened in 1911, boarding was mandatory. Less than half of students board. Since 1911 all students in their "Senior Two" (Grade 12) year are required to go into residence.

There are four houses in which Appleby's boarding students reside, and with which the day students are affiliated: Baillie House; Walker House; Colley House; and Powell's House. Baillie House is a girls' residence and named after a prominent family that has attended and supported Appleby for several generations. Walker House was one of three boys' residences before co-education and is now a girls' residence, and is named for the school's original benefactor, Sir Byron Edmund Walker. Colley and Powell's are boys' residences and are named for former Appleby Masters. T.B. Colley taught at Appleby for 35 years and was housemaster of School House, which was renamed in his honour in 1949. Vernon Powell received the Military Cross and died during World War I.

Students are divided into their respective houses in "Upper One" (Grade 9) and participate in house activities throughout the year. Boarding students in Baillie House and Powell's House have roommates. In Colley House and Walker House, students may be eligible to have a single room without a roommate.

== Campus facilities ==
A view of Creek Field at the southern end of the campus

The school has a main classroom building, dining hall, arena, five playing fields (one football size), five tennis courts, three squash courts, a gymnasium, a 20m swimming pool, four boarding houses and the Anglican John Bell Chapel, designed in the Westminster style. The chapel houses an Inuit-designed stained glass window, created on commission by Kenojuak Ashevak, O.C. As well, the south boundary of the campus runs along the shores of Lake Ontario, and a creek runs through the west side of campus, bordered by playing fields and forest.

=== Athletic facilities ===
The campus is equipped with four full-size soccer/rugby fields, an astro-turf field for field hockey and lacrosse, ice rink, a fitness room, three squash courts, a climbing wall, a gym, one outdoor basketball courts, a beach volleyball court, a 50-yard swimming pool and an athletic therapy centre.

With the new AWB Alumni Athletics centre built, Appleby now offers three more gyms, a new climbing wall, new yoga/meditation rooms, new squash courts, new spinning room, new weight room, and a new athletic therapy clinic.

=== Academic facilities ===
There are four science labs located by the Appleby Arena and several more located on the science wing. Each of the houses, Walker being the exception, are home to classrooms that are located on the basement level of the houses. The Samuel Academic Resource Centre is home to the Williams IT Centre, the Raymond Massey Reading Room and the Appleby Archives.

As of 2024, Appleby College has announced Cockwell Hall. It has not yet started building, and is expected to be done by 2026–2027.

=== Chapel ===
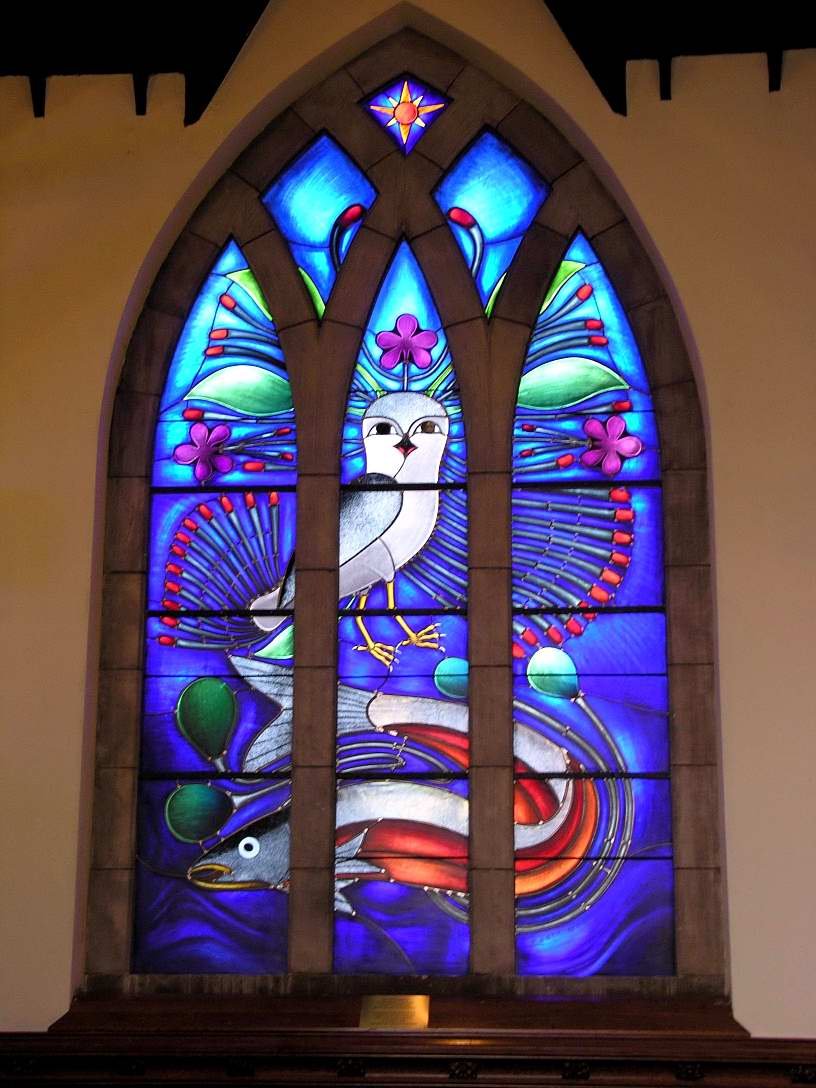
Window of John Bell Chapel, designed in 2004 by Kenojuak Ashevak

The John Bell Chapel features several stained glass windows, including 'Iggalaaq' (2004) by Kenojuak Ashevak and Sue Obata.

== Notable alumni ==
Notable alumni of Appleby College have included:

- Raymond Massey (1914), actor
- Andrew Dyas MacLean (1914), Canadian naval officer, journalist, and publisher
- John Marshall Harlan II (1916), Justice of the United States Supreme Court (1955–1971)
- George Montegu Black II (1929), Canadian business executive, father of Conrad Black, Baron Black of Crossharbour
- Crawford Gordon Jr. (1931), president of Avro Canada
- George Atkins (1934), founder, Developing Countries Farm Radio Network; member, Order of Canada
- Norman Atkins (1953), Canadian senator
- Dan Hays (1958), Canadian senator, former Leader of the Opposition in the Senate
- Bill Gairdner (1960), Olympic athlete (decathlon, Tokyo, 1964), conservative author
- John Kent Harrison (1964), television director
- Kent Angus (1970), businessman and Paul Loicq Award winner
- Jeff Fairholm (1984), Canadian Football League player
- Tim Footman (1986), English author, journalist and editor
- Michael E. Raynor (1986), business writer
- Dylan Neal (1987), actor
- Mani Haghighi (1988), Iranian film director
- Colin Ferguson (1990), actor
- Bryan Baeumler (1992), television presenter for HGTV's Disaster DIY and Disaster DIY: Cottage
- David Richmond-Peck (1992), Canadian actor
- Nathan Rogers (1997), Canadian folk musician, son of Stan Rogers
- Evanka Osmak (1998), sports broadcaster
- Mikhail Svetov (2003), Russian politician and public figure
- Phil Mackenzie (2005), Canadian national rugby team player
- Jeff Batchelor (2006), Canadian Olympic snowboarder
- Sam Gagner (2007), Canadian professional hockey player
- Brianne Jenner (2009), Canadian Olympic hockey player
- Lauren Howe (2010), Miss Universe Canada 2017
- Jillian Saulnier (2011), Canadian Olympic hockey player
- Anissa Gamble (2011), Canadian professional hockey player
- Sarah Steele (2013), Canadian professional hockey player
- Amy Curlew (2016), Canadian professional hockey player
- Fraser McConnell (2017), professional racing driver
- Jaime Bourbonnais (2019), Canadian Olympic hockey player

== Faculty ==
Notable faculty members of Appleby College have included:

- David Partridge, Canadian painter, etcher, sculptor, educator and past President of the Royal Canadian Academy of Arts
- Dacre Stoker, Canadian-American author, sportsman and filmmaker, great-grandnephew of Irish author Bram Stoker
- Eric Koch, German-born Canadian author, broadcaster and academic
- Wolff-Michael Roth, Learning scientist at the University of Victoria
- David Boyd, Canadian author
- Glen Downey, Canadian author
- Sharon Creelman, Canadian Olympic field hockey player

== Headmasters (As of 2012 Principal) ==
- John S.H. Guest 1911–1934
- Percival Wickens 1934–1937
- Rev. Canon John A.M. Bell 1937–1968
- Edward R. Larsen 1968–1980
- J.E. Dickens (Acting) 1980–1981
- Alexis S. Troubetzkoy 1981–1987
- Guy S. McLean 1987–2012
- Innes van Nostrand 2012–present

== See also ==
- Education in Ontario
- List of secondary schools in Ontario
