= Wolff-Michael Roth =

Learning scientist at the University of Victoria

Wolff-Michael Roth (born June 28, 1953, Heidelberg) is a learning scientist at the University of Victoria (emeritus) conducting research on how people across the life span know and learn mathematics and science. He has contributed to numerous fields of research: learning science in learning communities, coteaching, authentic school science education, cultural-historical activity theory, social studies of science, gesture studies, qualitative research methods, embodied cognition, situated cognition, and the role of language in learning science and mathematics.

== Career ==
Roth received a master's degree of physics from the University of Würzburg and completed a doctorate in the College of Science and Technology at the University of Southern Mississippi (Hattiesburg, Mississippi) with concentrations in cognition, statistics, and physical chemistry. He began to establish himself as a researcher while teaching at Appleby College (Oakville, Ontario). There, he did the research for what became one of the first research articles on the social construction of knowledge in science classrooms: "The social construction of scientific concepts or The concept map as conscription device and tool for social thinking in high school science." There he also conducted the work that would lead to Authentic School Science, in which he provides evidence for how high school students learn science when provided with opportunities to frame their own research questions, which they then answer by designing and conducting experiments. They write up their results, which they have to be able to defend within their learning community. In 1992, he joined Simon Fraser University (Burnaby, British Columbia), where he was mainly responsible for teaching statistics in the Faculty of Education. In his research, he initially focused on learning in science classrooms, but soon expanded his work to learning mathematics and science among future teachers, research scientists, and designers of computer software. In 1997, he was appointed Lansdowne Professor of Applied Cognitive Science at the University of Victoria. There he further expanded his research on the learning of mathematics and science, for example, on the use of graphs in scientific research and in technical professions.

== Main Contributions ==
Although he worked within a neo-Piagetian (information processing oriented) paradigm during his doctoral research, using statistical methods, his subsequent work was initially based in school science classrooms and later extended to mathematics and science in fish hatcheries, environmental activism, field ecology, scientific laboratories, dental practice, water technicians, construction sites, and in local communities.

=== Graphing as Social Practice ===
Psychologist tend to theorize graphing, as all other forms of representing activity, as a faculty of the mind. Based on his ethnographic studies of mathematics among scientists, Roth proposes to view graphing as a social practice that humans learn in relation with others; the relation is what we subsequently attribute to the mind. Because graphing is a social fact, it can be studied using anthropological methods, which is precisely what Roth proposes in Towards an Anthropology of Graphing and in a comprehensive review of the literature.

=== Gesture Studies ===
Gestures constitute an integral aspect of knowing and learning. Arising from his studies of learning in high school science laboratories and hands-on elementary school activities, Roth showed how students' scientific knowledge arises from what initially are simply manipulative movements and hand movements to explore and learn about the natural world. These movements later become symbolic movements, that is, gestures, which encode the earliest forms of knowing that can be observed prior to verbal forms. In the main review journal of educational research he published a summary of the work in psychology, anthropology, and linguistics.

=== Coteaching ===
Whereas in many professions, practitioner learn while working with others, teachers have to figure out much of their knowledge on their own. Using it initially as a form of staff development, Roth, subsequently working with Ken Tobin, developed coteaching as a form learning to teach while teaching. Together they published At the Elbow of Another, in which they lay out the foundation of this approach. In this model, supervision and evaluation of teaching and research on teaching have to be conducted by teaching together with the resident teachers.

=== Cultural-Historical Activity Theory ===
Roth has contributed to this field especially by theorizing school-related processes in terms of a version of this theory that was popularized in the Center for Activity Theory and Developmental Work Research. He proposed a fourth generation of this theory, which takes into account emotion. Together with Yew Jin Lee, he wrote a review of the literature on this "neglected legacy" of the work of Lev S. Vygotsky.

=== Knowing in the Flesh ===
Most recently, Roth has been working on questions of embodied cognition, which is in fact a misnomer, for all cognition inherently is embodied. Following the French philosophers Maine de Biran and Michel Henry he conceives of the emergence of signification from the auto-affection of the flesh. All perception, all knowing, all communication therefore arises from forms of movement. In a number of publications, he develops this way of understanding knowing with data from geometry in second-grade classrooms.

=== Toward an Evental Perspective ===
Since 2013, Roth has focused on developing theories that account for experience and activities from an evental perspective, which contrasts the object ontology characteristic of research in the social sciences. The distinction parallels that which Harold Garfinkel made between formal methods, studying social facts (e.g., a waiting line), and ethnomethodology, which focuses on studying the doing (visible), the results of which receive the names of these facts in a practice called formulating. One important area of research was to implement the change that L.S. Vygotsky announced during the last months of his life, where, in his notebooks, he renounced all of his prior work. Roth and colleagues named this their "late Vygotskian, Spinozist approach". A final development in Roth’s work can be observed in his turn to a pragmatist foundation – following J. Dewey, Mead, W. James and A.N. Whitehead – that takes an transactional vs. interactional approach to the analysis and understanding of social life.

== Academic Honors and Service ==
- Honorary Doctorate from the University of Ioannina (Ioannina, Greece), 2011.
- Significant Contribution to Educational Measurement and Research Methodology, AERA Div K
- American Educational Research Association, Fellow, 2009
- American Association for the Advancement of Science, Fellow, 2009
- Distinguished Contributions Award from the National Association for Research in Science Teaching
- Canadian Education Association Whitworth Award for Education Research, 2006
- AERA Division K Award for Exemplary Research in Teaching and Teacher Education, 2005

== Selected publications ==
- Roth, W.-M. (2020). Adventures of mind and mathematics. Springer.
- Roth, W.-M. (2019). Transactional psychology of education: Toward a strong version of the social. Springer.
- Roth, W.-M., & Jornet, A. (2017). Understanding educational psychology: A late Vygotskian, Spinozist approach. Springer.
- Roth, W.-M. (2016). Concrete human psychology. New York, NY: Routledge.
- Roth, W.-M. (2014). Uncertainty and graphing in discovery work: Implications for and applications in STEM education. Dordrecht, The Netherlands: Springer.
- Roth, W.-M. (2011). Geometry as objective science in elementary classrooms: Mathematics in the flesh. New York, NY: Routledge.
- Roth, W.-M. (2011). Passibility: At the limits of the constructivist metaphor. Dordrecht, The Netherlands: Springer.
- Roth, W.-M. (2010). Language, learning, context: Talking the talk. London: Routledge.
- Roth, W.-M. (2009). Dialogism: A Bakhtinian perspective on science and learning. Rotterdam: Sense Publishers.
- Ercikan, K., & Roth, W.-M. (Eds.). (2008). Generalization in educational research. New York: Routledge.
- Roth, W.-M. (2006). Learning science: A singular plural perspective. Rotterdam: Sense Publishers.
- Roth, W.-M. (2005). Doing qualitative research: Praxis of methods. Rotterdam: Sense Publishers.
- Roth, W.-M. (2005). Talking science: Language and learning in science. Lanham, MD: Rowman & Littlefield.
- Roth, W.-M., & Barton, A. C. (2004). Rethinking scientific literacy. New York: Routledge.
- Roth, W.-M. (2002). Being and becoming in the classroom. Westport, CT: Ablex/Greenwood.
- Roth, W.-M. (1998). Designing communities. Dordrecht, Netherlands: Kluwer Academic Publishers.
- Roth, W.-M. (1995). Authentic school science: Knowing and learning in open-inquiry science laboratories. Dordrecht, Netherlands: Kluwer Academic Publishers.
