= Reading Partners =

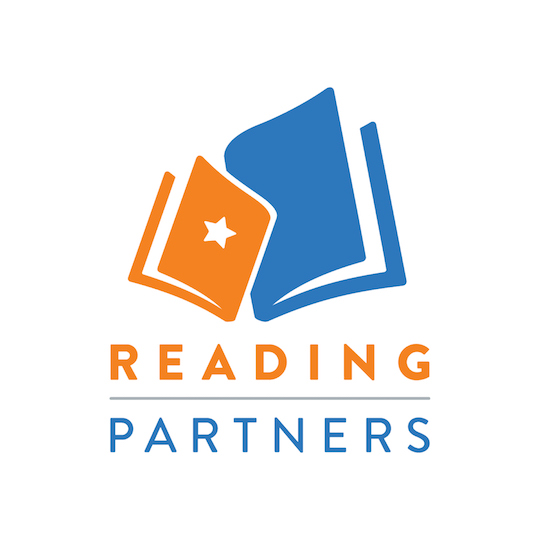

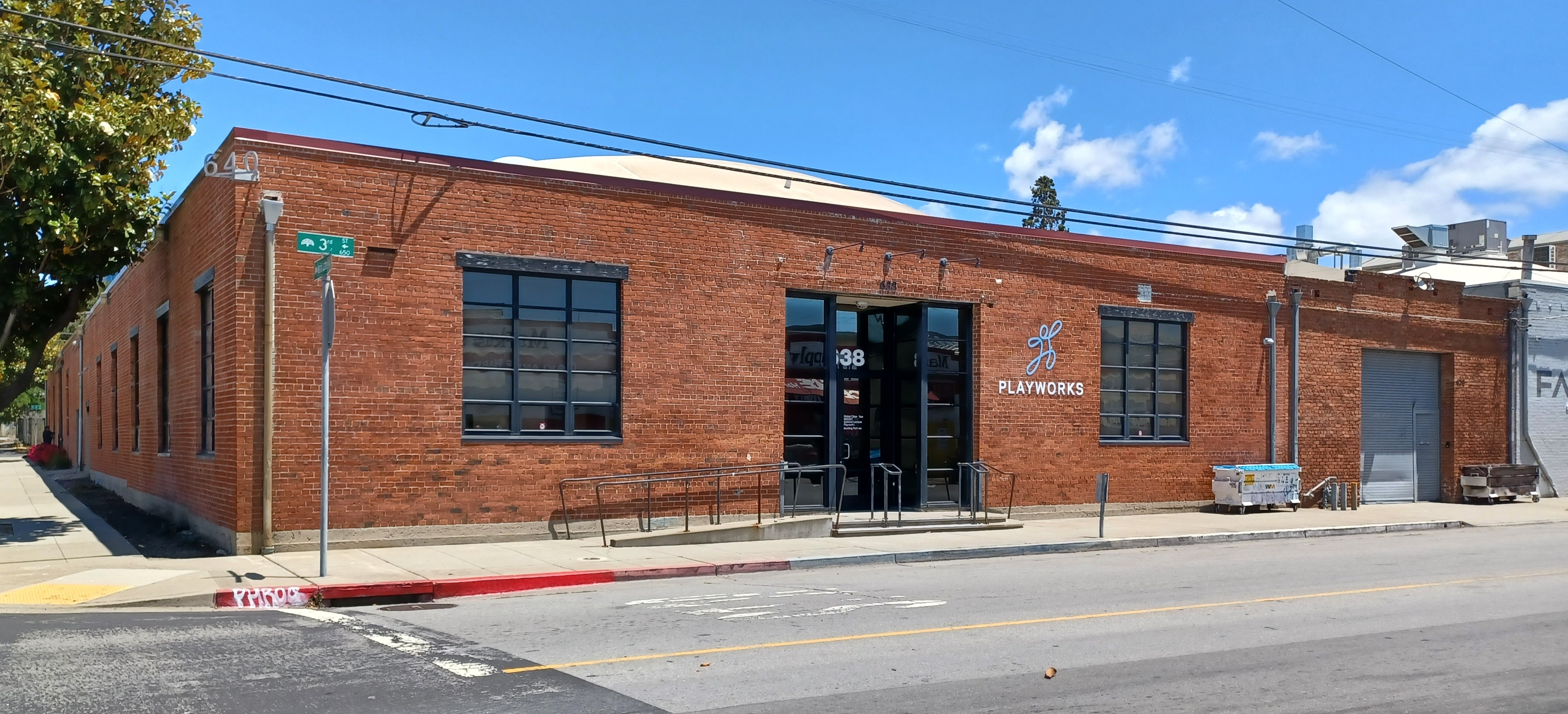
- National office in Oakland
- Founded: Founded as YES Reading in 1999. Incorporated as a 501c3 nonprofit in 2001
- Purpose: Children's Literacy
- Location: Oakland, California
- Region served: San Francisco Bay Area; Silicon Valley; Los Angeles County; New York City; Washington DC; Baltimore; North Texas; Denver; South Carolina; Tulsa; Seattle; Twin Cities
- Key people: Adeola Whitney, CEO; Dan Carrol, Board Chair; Walter Elcock, Board Vice Chair
- Revenue: $28M
- Employees: 250
- Website: readingpartners.org

Reading Partners is a children's literacy nonprofit based in Oakland, California with programs in over 40 school districts throughout California, New York, Washington DC, Maryland, Texas, Colorado, South Carolina, Minnesota, Oklahoma, and Washington.

In the 2023–2024 school year, Reading Partners delivered individualized reading tutoring to 7,231 students in 180 partner schools.

== Program ==
In its core program, Reading Partners operates reading centers at elementary schools in under-served communities where children reading below grade level receive free one-on-one tutoring from volunteers using a structured, research-based curriculum. The program is proven to improve students' progress in reading, with over 87% meeting or exceeding their end of year growth goals, according to the Reading Partners impact report released in 2024.

Teachers refer students to the campus Reading Partners program, where they receive the one-on-one attention of a trained volunteer tutor for ninety minutes each week. Tutoring sessions focus on building students’ reading skills in five critical areas of literacy: phonemic awareness, phonics, vocabulary, fluency, and comprehension. Reading Partners’ curricular materials consist of three key components, each of which address different levels of reading ability with curriculum-based, logically sequenced materials. Upon entry into Reading Partners, every student is assessed using the Rigby PM Ultra Benchmarking Kit and placed into one of the three programs depending on the child's individual needs.

== History ==
Reading Partners began at Belle Haven Elementary School in Menlo Park when members of the community joined to help students struggling with reading skills. At the time, fewer than 1 in 5 students at Belle Haven could read at grade level and more than 80% of students qualified for the National School Lunch Program. Starting with just three volunteers working in the school library, the organization quickly grew to serve more than 100 children at Belle Haven and began replicating to nearby Title I elementary schools.

Originally called YES Reading, the organization changed its name to Reading Partners in 2008. From 2008 to 2016, the program expanded from serving 20 elementary schools in California to over 250 schools in 10 states and the District of Columbia.
