= The Innovator's Dilemma =

1997 book by Clayton M. Christensen

The Innovator's Dilemma: When New Technologies Cause Great Firms to Fail
- Author: Clayton Christensen
- Language: English
- Genre: Business theory
- Publisher: Harvard Business Review Press; 1st edition (May 1, 1997)
- Publication date: 1997; 29 years ago
- Publication place: United States
- ISBN: 0875845851
- Followed by: The Innovator's Solution
- Website: www.claytonchristensen.com/books/the-innovators-dilemma

The Innovator's Dilemma: When New Technologies Cause Great Firms to Fail, first published in 1997, is the best-known work of the Harvard professor and businessman Clayton Christensen. It expands on the concept of disruptive technologies, a term he coined in a 1995 article "Disruptive Technologies: Catching the Wave". It describes how large incumbent companies lose market share by listening to their customers and providing what appears to be the highest-value products, but new companies that serve low-value customers with poorly developed technology can improve that technology incrementally until it is good enough to quickly take market share from established business. Christensen recommends that large companies maintain small, nimble divisions that attempt to replicate this phenomenon internally to avoid being blindsided and overtaken by startup competitors.

== Subject matter ==
Clayton Christensen demonstrates how successful, outstanding companies can do everything "right" and still lose their market leadership, or even fail, as new, unexpected competitors rise and take over the market. This dilemma has two key parts:

1. Value to innovation is an S-curve: Improving a product takes time and many iterations. The first of these iterations provide minimal value to a customer, but in time the base is created and the value increases exponentially. Once the base is created, then each iteration is dramatically better than the last. At some point, the most valuable improvements are complete and the value per iteration becomes minimal again. So in the middle is the most value, at the start and end the value is minimal.
2. Incumbent sized deals: An incumbent has the luxury of a large customer set, and expectations of high yearly sales. New entry next generation products find niches away from the incumbent customer set to build the new product. The new entry companies do not need the yearly sales of the incumbent and thus have more time to focus and innovate on this smaller venture.

For this reason, the next generation product is not being built for an incumbent's customer set and this large customer set is not interested in the new innovation and keeps demanding more innovation with the incumbent product. Unfortunately, this incumbent innovation is limited to the overall value of the product as it is at the latter end of the S-curve. Meanwhile, the new entrant is deep into the S-curve and providing significant value to the new product. By the time the new product becomes interesting to the incumbent's customers it is too late for an incumbent to react to the new product. At this point it is too late for an incumbent to keep up with the new entrant's rate of improvement, which by then is on the near-vertical part of its S-curve trajectory.

Based on this multi-industry study, Christensen introduces the theory of "disruptive innovation", popularising the idea in business parlance.

Christensen then argues that the following are common principles that incumbents must address:

- Resource dependence: Current customers drive a company's use of resources
- Small markets struggle to impact an incumbent's large market
- Disruptive technologies have fluid futures, as in, it is impossible to know what they will disrupt once matured
- Incumbent organizations' value is more than simply their workers, it includes their processes and core capabilities which drive their efforts
- Technology supply may not equal market demand. The attributes that make disruptive technologies unattractive in established markets are often the ones that have the greatest value in emerging markets

He also argues the following strategies assist incumbents in succeeding against the disruptive technology:

- They develop the disruptive technology with the "right" customers. Not necessarily their current customer set
- They place the disruptive technology into an autonomous organization that can be rewarded with small wins and small customer sets
- They fail early and often to find the correct disruptive technology
- They allow the disrupting organization to use all of the company's resources when needed but are careful to make sure the processes and values were not those of the company

=== Examples ===
Christensen's main example is the hard drive industry of the late 20th century. Other examples include the disruption of the mainframe computer market by personal computers, and the disruption of the laser printer market by inkjet printers. The author also touches on technologies which would become highly disruptive in future decades, including handheld computers (then known as personal digital assistants) like the Apple Newton, and electric vehicles.

Christensen also highlights the disruption of traditional variety store and department stores by discount stores starting in the 1960s. This trend saw the S. S. Kresge Company replace itself with Kmart, Dayton Hudson replace itself with Target. F. W. Woolworth launched its own discount chain Woolco; Christensen attributes its failure to a lack of organizational and cultural separation between the management for high-margin Woolworth and Woolco (which needed lower margins but high volume in order to successfully compete). Sears, Montgomery Ward, JC Penney, and Macy's did not create discount chains, and consequently lost market share.

== Reception ==
Shortly after the release of the book, it received the Global Business Book Award as the best business book of the year (1997). The Economist also named it as one of the six most important books about business ever written".

== Impact on business world ==
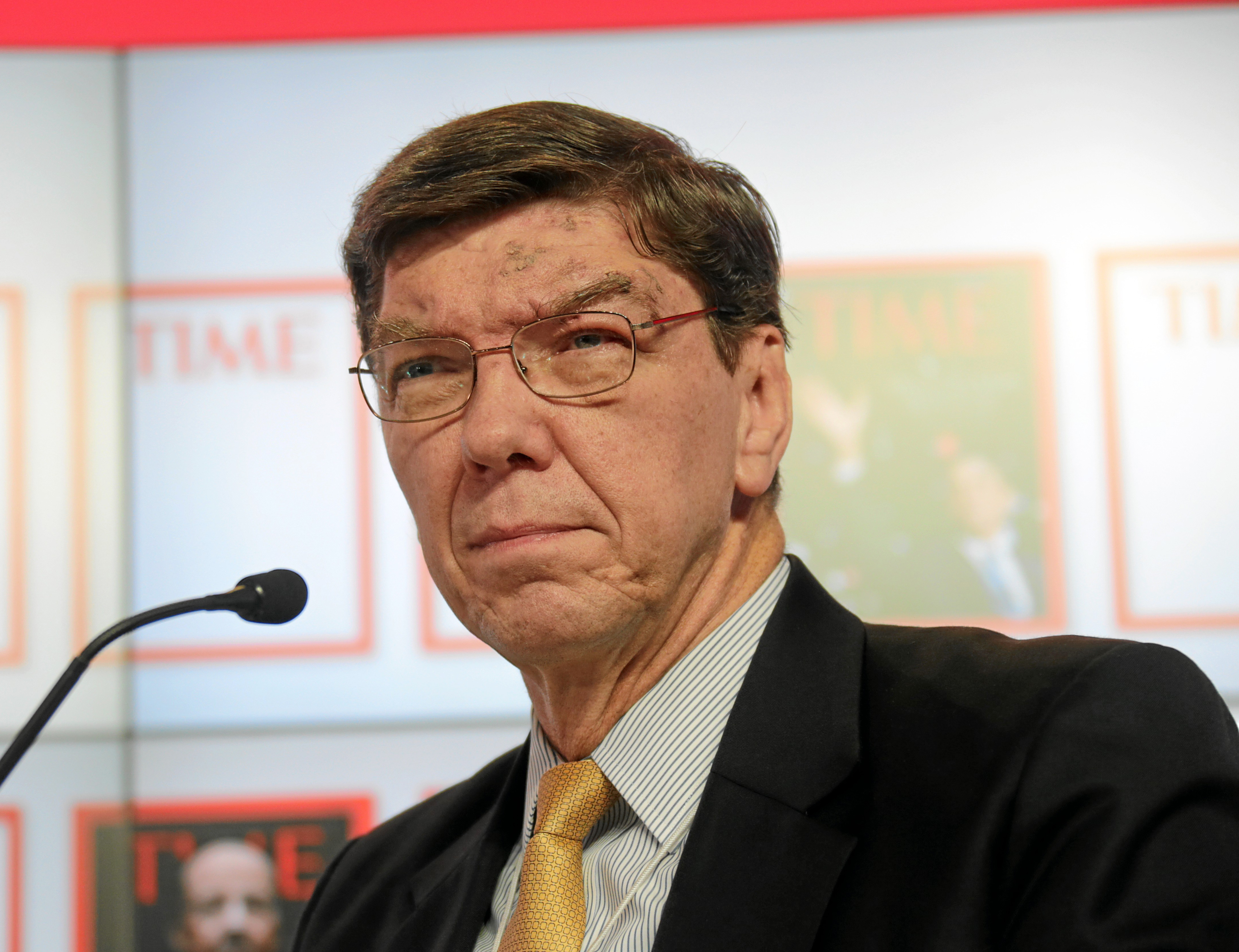
Christensen at the World Economic Forum Annual Meeting in 2013

The term disruptive technologies was first described in depth with this book by Christensen; but the term was later changed to disruptive innovation in a later book (The Innovator's Solution). A disruptive innovation is an innovation that creates a new market and value network that will eventually disrupt an already existing market and replace an existing product.

== Recent work ==
Since the book was published, various articles have been written, both critiquing and supporting Clayton Christensen's work.

The Innovator's Dilemma proved popular: it was reprinted, and a follow-up book titled The Innovator's Solution was published. His books Disrupting Class about education and The Innovator's Prescription about health care both use ideas from The Innovator's Dilemma.

An empirical study replicated the Innovator's Dilemma's main prediction that incumbents innovate less than entrants in a study of the hard disk industry. It found the main reason for the comparable lack of innovation by incumbents lies in the reduced incentives to innovate due to product cannibalization.
