= National Center for Public Policy and Higher Education =

The National Center for Public Policy and Higher Education was an independent, nonprofit, nonpartisan organization about higher education in the United States.

== Overview ==
It was established in 1998. It received funding from The Pew Charitable Trusts. It was headquartered in San Jose, California. Its board of directors was chaired by former North Carolina Governor Jim Hunt. Virginia B. Smith was a founding director.

It closed in June 2011.

== See also ==
- List of higher education associations and organizations in the United States
