= Clayton Christensen =

American academic and business consultant (1952–2020)

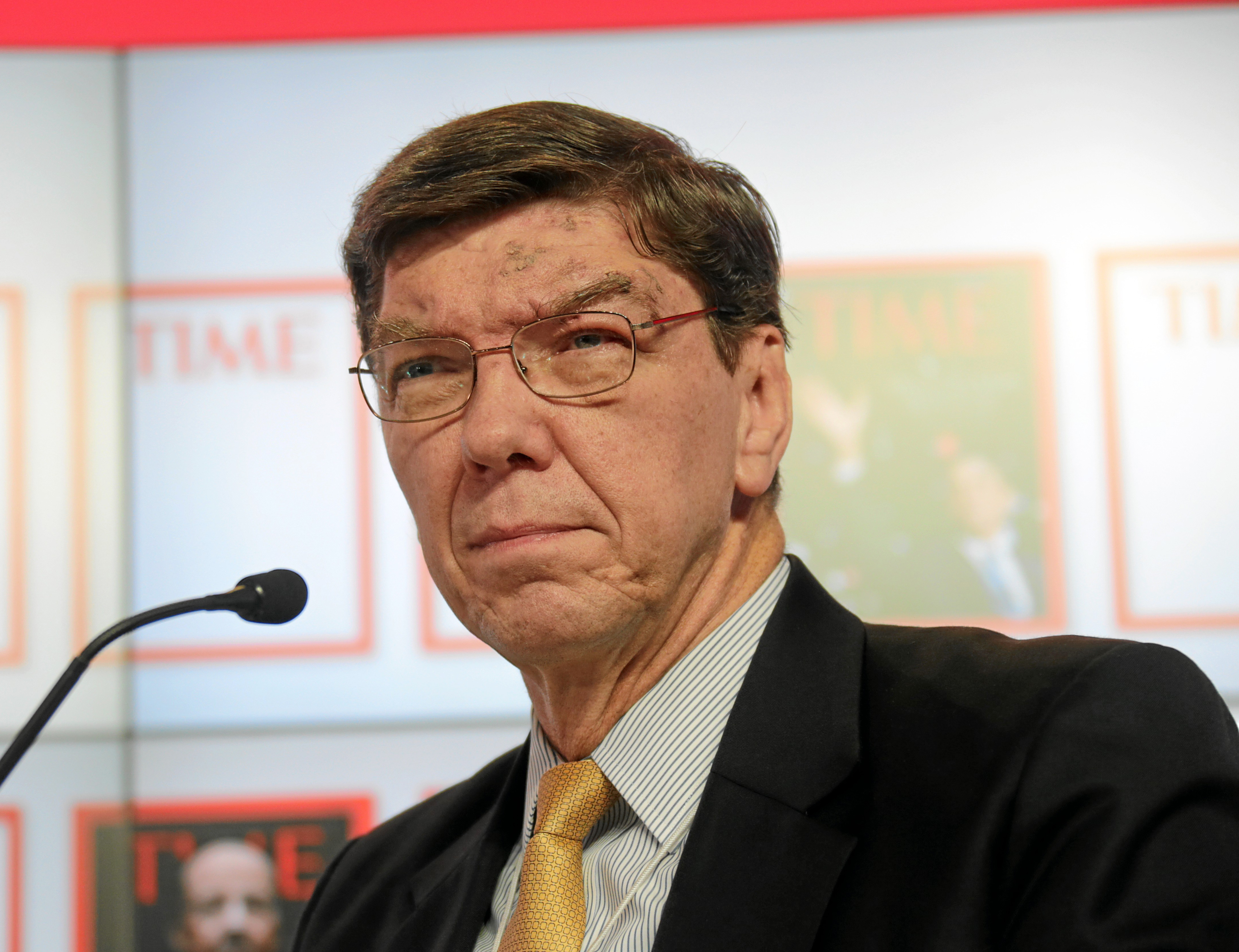
- Christensen at the World Economic Forum Annual Meeting in 2013
- Born: Clayton Magleby Christensen; April 6, 1952; Salt Lake City, Utah, US
- Died: January 23, 2020 (aged 67); Boston, Massachusetts, US
- Education: Brigham Young University (BA); Queen's College, Oxford (MPhil); Harvard University (MBA, DBA)
- Known for: "Disruption" and "disruptive innovation" concepts The Innovator's Dilemma

Clayton Magleby Christensen (April 6, 1952 – January 23, 2020) was an American academic and business consultant who developed the theory of "disruptive innovation", which has been called the most influential business idea of the early 21st century. Christensen introduced "disruption" in his 1997 book The Innovator's Dilemma, and it led The Economist to term him "the most influential management thinker of his time". He was the Kim B. Clark Professor of Business Administration at the Harvard Business School (HBS).

He was one of the founders of the Jobs to Be Done development methodology.. Christensen was also a co-founder of Rose Park Advisors, a venture capital firm, and Innosight, a management consulting and investment firm specializing in innovation.

He was also a leader and writer in the Church of Jesus Christ of Latter-day Saints (LDS Church).

== Early life ==
Clayton Christensen was born on April 6, 1952, in Salt Lake City, Utah, the second of eight children born to Robert M. Christensen (1926–1976) and his wife, Verda Mae Christensen (née Fuller; 1922–2004). He grew up in the Rose Park neighborhood of Salt Lake City and attended West High School, where he was student body president. At 6 feet 8 inches (2.03 m) tall, he was also an avid basketball player. Christensen and his siblings were raised as members of the LDS Church.

== Education ==
=== Brigham Young University ===
After graduating from high school in 1970, Christensen was accepted to Harvard University, Yale University, and Brigham Young University (BYU). He "decided to make the decision a matter of prayer" and felt a "clear impression" to attend BYU, which had awarded him a full scholarship. Christensen majored in economics, and was classmates in his first-year economics course with future U.S. presidential candidate Mitt Romney and future HBS dean Kim B. Clark. While at BYU, he took a two-year leave of absence from 1971 to 1973 to serve as a full-time missionary for the LDS Church. He was assigned to serve in South Korea and became a fluent speaker of Korean. Christensen returned to BYU after completing his missionary service, and in 1975 graduated summa cum laude with honors with a bachelor's degree in economics.

=== Oxford University ===
Following graduation from BYU, Christensen was awarded a Rhodes Scholarship and spent two years studying applied econometrics at Queen's College, Oxford, receiving a master's degree in 1977. While at Oxford, Christensen was the starting center on the men's basketball team, winning back-to-back British University Sports Federation championships in 1975 and 1976 and the English Basketball Association's national championship for non-league teams in 1977.

=== Harvard University ===
Once Christensen completed his degree program at Oxford, he returned to the United States to attend HBS where he received an MBA with high distinction in 1979. He later returned to Harvard for his doctoral study in business, receiving a Doctor of Business Administration (DBA) degree in 1992.

== Career ==
=== 1979–1989 ===
After receiving his MBA in 1979, Christensen began working for Boston Consulting Group (BCG) as a consultant and project manager. In 1982, he was named a White House Fellow and took a one-year leave of absence from BCG to work in Washington, D.C. as an assistant to the United States Secretary of Transportation, serving under both Drew Lewis and Elizabeth Dole. In 1984, he and several professors from the Massachusetts Institute of Technology founded an advanced ceramics company named Ceramics Process Systems Corporation (now known as CPS Technologies). Christensen served as its president and CEO through the late 1980s until he decided to leave the company to pursue a DBA degree.

=== 1990–1999 ===
After completing his doctoral study, Christensen joined the HBS faculty and set a record by achieving the rank of full professor in only six years.

At HBS, he taught an elective course he designed named "Building and Sustaining a Successful Enterprise", which teaches how to build and manage an enduring, successful company or transform an existing organization. He also taught in many of the school's executive education programs. Christensen was awarded a full professorship with tenure in 1998 and held eight honorary doctorates and an honorary chaired professorship at the National Tsinghua University in Taiwan.

=== After 2000 ===
In 2000, he founded Innosight LLC, a consulting and training firm. In 2005, together with his colleagues at Innosight, he launched Innosight Ventures, a venture firm focused on investing in South Asia, Southeast Asia, and East Asia. In 2007, he co-founded Rose Park Advisors LLC (RPA) (named after the Salt Lake City neighborhood where he grew up), an investment company that applied his research as an investment strategy.

He served on the board of directors of Tata Consultancy Services (NSE: TCS), Franklin Covey (NYSE: FC), and the Becket Fund for Religious Liberty. He also served for a time on the editorial board of the Deseret News.

Christensen wrote ten books, including his seminal work The Innovator's Dilemma (1997), which received the Global Business Book Award for the best business book of the year. One of the main concepts depicted in this book is also his most disseminated and famous one: disruptive innovation. The concept has been growing in interest over time since 2004, according to Google Trends data. However, due to constant misinterpretation, Christensen often wrote articles trying to explain the concept even further. Some of his other books are focused on specific industries and discuss social issues such as education and health care. Disrupting Class (2008) looks at the root causes of why schools struggle and offers solutions, while The Innovator's Prescription (2009) examines how to fix the American healthcare system. The latter two books received awards as the best books on education and health care in their respective years of publication. The Innovator's Prescription was also awarded the 2010 James A. Hamilton Award, by the College of Healthcare Executives.

Christensen co‑founded RPA, an investment firm that applies his research on disruptive innovation to private‑market investing. RPA was an early investor in the South Korean e‑commerce company Coupang, and was listed among Coupang’s pre‑IPO shareholders; RPA's stake was reported at approximately 5.1% following Coupang's initial public offering on the New York Stock Exchange in March 2021. Coupang priced 130 million shares at $35 per share, raising about $4.55 billion in the offering and implying an initial valuation in the neighborhood of $60 billion at the IPO price; strong first‑day trading pushed Coupang's market capitalization substantially higher, with contemporaneous reports citing day‑one market‑cap figures in the range of roughly $75–85 billion. The Coupang IPO and the post‑IPO valuation gains for RPA occurred after his death.

In 2017, Christensen predicted that "50 percent of the 4,000 colleges and universities in the U.S. will be bankrupt in 10 to 15 years."

== Personal life ==
After returning to the United States from his LDS Church mission to South Korea, Christensen began serving with the Boy Scouts of America in a variety of roles. Over a period of 25 years, he served as scoutmaster, cub master, den leader, and as a troop and pack committee chairman.

Christensen and his wife, Christine (née Quinn), married in 1976. They had three sons, Matthew, Michael, and Spencer, and two daughters, Ann and Catherine. Their eldest son, Matthew (b. 1977), was a member of Duke University's 2001 National Championship basketball team.

Christensen served in several leadership positions in the LDS Church, including as an area seventy from 2002 to 2009, a counselor in the presidency of the Massachusetts Boston Mission, and as a bishop. His book, The Power of Everyday Missionaries, was a leading work in the LDS Church on how all people could be involved in sharing the gospel no matter their position in the church. He was also a moving force behind the creation of For All The Saints, a book by Kristen Smith Dayley on the history of the LDS Church in New England, published in 2012 to which Christensen wrote the foreword.

Christensen was also very involved in his community of Belmont, Massachusetts. After moving his family to Belmont in the early 1990s to continue his education at HBS, he was elected to the Belmont Town Council where he served for eight years. Christensen was also instrumental in the use of internet learning for students of Belmont High School to decrease the rising costs of education.

In February 2010, Christensen was diagnosed with follicular lymphoma, and in July 2010 he had an ischemic stroke that damaged his speech and required him to undergo speech therapy. Christensen died from complications of leukemia on January 23, 2020, at age 67.

== Honors and awards ==
- 2011: Recognized by Forbes for being "one of the most influential business theorists of the last 50 years" in a cover story.
- 2011 & 2013: Ranked number 1 in the Thinkers 50 which is awarded biannually to the world's most prestigious management thinkers.
- 2014: Awarded the Herbert Simon Award for excellence in business and management studies.
- 2015: Honored with an Edison Achievement Award for his commitment to innovation throughout his career.
- 2015: Awarded the Brigham Young University Distinguished Service Award for embodying "Christ-like charity and service."
- 2017: Ranked number 3 in the Thinkers 50.

== Publications ==
=== Journal articles ===
- "Disruptive technologies: catching the wave", Harvard Business Review, (January–February 1995), Christensen, Clayton M.; Bower, Joseph L.
- "Meeting the challenge of disruptive change", Harvard Business Review, (March–April 2000), Christensen, Clayton M.; Overdorf, Michael.
- "Marketing malpractice: the cause and the cure", Harvard Business Review, 83 (12): 74–83, 152, PMID 16334583, (December 2005), Christensen, Clayton M.; Cook, Scott; Hall, Taddy.
- "The tools of cooperation and change", Harvard Business Review, 84 (10): 72–80, 148 PMID 17040041, (October 2006), Christensen, Clayton M.; Marx, Matthew; Stevenson, Howard H.
- "Disruptive innovation for social change", Harvard Business Review, 84 (12): 94–101, 163, PMID 17183796, (December 2006), Christensen, Clayton M.; Baumann, Heiner; Ruggles, Rudy; Sadtler, Thomas M.
- "How will you measure your life?", Harvard Business Review (July–August 2010) Christensen, Clayton M.
- "Know Your Customers' 'Jobs To Be Done'", Harvard Business Review (September 2016), Christensen, Clayton M.; Dillon, Karen; Hall, Taddy; Duncan, David.
- "The Hard Truth about Business Model Innovation", MIT Sloan Management Review (September 2016), Christensen, Clayton M.; Bartman, Tom; van Bever, Derek.

=== Books ===
- The Innovator's Dilemma: When New Technologies Cause Great Firms to Fail, (1997) Christensen, Clayton M.
- The Innovator's Solution: Creating and Sustaining Successful Growth, (2003), Christensen, Clayton M.; Raynor, Michael E.
- Innovation and the General Manager, (2003) Christensen, Clayton M.
- Seeing What's Next: Using the Theories of Innovation to Predict Industry Change, (2004), Anthony, Scott D.; Christensen, Clayton M.; Roth, Erik A.
- Disrupting Class: How Disruptive Innovation Will Change the Way the World Learns, (2008), Christensen, Clayton M.; Horn, Michael.
- The Innovator's Prescription: A Disruptive Solution for Health Care, (2008), Christensen, Clayton M.; Grossman, Jerome H.; Hwang, Jason.
- The Innovative University: Changing the DNA of Higher Education, (2011), Christensen, Clayton M.;Eyring, Henry J.
- The Innovator's DNA: Mastering the Five Skills of Disruptive Innovators, (2011), Christensen, Clayton M.; Dyer, Jeff; Gregersen, Hal.
- How Will You Measure Your Life?, (2012), Allworth, James; Christensen, Clayton M.; Dillon, Karen.
- The Power of Everyday Missionaries: The What and How of Sharing the Gospel, (2013) Christensen, Clayton M.
- Competing Against Luck: The Story of Innovation and Customer Choice, (2016), Christensen, Clayton M.; Dillon, Karen; Duncan, David; Hall, Taddy.
- The Prosperity Paradox: How Innovation Can Lift Nations out of Poverty, (2019), Christensen, Clayton M.; Dillon, Karen; Ojomo, Efosa.
