= Learning community =

Group of people cooperating to achieve academic goals

A learning community is a group of people who share common academic goals and attitudes and meet semi-regularly to collaborate on classwork. Such communities have become the template for a cohort-based, interdisciplinary approach to higher education. This may be based on an advanced kind of educational or 'pedagogical' design.

McMillan and Chavis (1986) proposed that a sense of community comprises four elements: membership, influence, integration and fulfilment of needs, and shared emotional connection. Membership refers to members' feelings of belonging and identification with the community. Influence involves both members' ability to affect the community and the community's influence on its members. Integration and fulfilment of needs refers to members' expectations that participation in the community will help meet their needs. Shared emotional connection involves identification with a shared history and experiences.

Learning communities are now fairly common to American colleges and universities, and are also found in Europe.

== History ==
In a summary of the history of the concept of learning communities, Wolff-Michael Roth and Lee Yew Jin suggest that until the early 1990s, and consistent with (until then) dominant Piagetian constructivist and information processing paradigms in education, the individual was seen as the "unit of instruction" and the focus of research. Roth and Lee claim this as a watershed period when influenced by the work of Jean Lave, and Lave and Etienne Wenger among others, researchers and practitioners switched to the idea that was knowing and knowledgeability are better thought of as cultural practices that are exhibited by practitioners belonging to various communities; which, following Lave and Wenger's early work, are often termed communities of practice.

Roth and Lee claim that this led to forms of praxis (learning and teaching designs implemented in the classroom, and influenced by these ideas) in which students were encouraged to share their ways of doing mathematics, history, science, etc. with each other. In other words, students take part in the construction of consensual domains and "participate in the negotiation and institutionalisation of ... meaning". In effect, they are participating in learning communities. Roth and Lee go on to analyse the contradictions inherent in this as a theoretically informed practice in education.

Roth and Lee are concerned with the learning community as a theoretical and analytical category; they critique how some educators use the notion to design learning environments without considering the fundamental structures implied in the category. Their analysis does not consider the appearance of learning communities in the United States in the early 1980s. For example, the Evergreen State College, which is widely considered a pioneer in this area, established an intercollegiate learning community in 1984. In 1985, this same college established the Washington Center for Improving the Quality of Undergraduate Education, which focuses on collaborative education approaches, including learning communities as one of its centrepieces.

Learning communities began to gain popularity at other U.S. colleges and universities during the late 80s and throughout the 90s. The Washington Center's National Learning Commons Directory has over 250 learning community initiatives in colleges and universities throughout the nation.

== Models ==
Learning communities can take many forms. According to Barbara Leigh Smith of the Evergreen State College,

The learning community approach fundamentally restructure the curriculum and the time and space of students. Many different curricular restructuring models are being used. Still, all of the learning community models intentionally link together courses or coursework to provide greater curricular coherence, more opportunities for active teaming, and interaction between students and faculty.

Experts frequently describe five basic nonresidential learning community models:

1. Linked courses: Students take two connected courses, usually one disciplinary course such as history or biology and one skills course such as writing, speech, or information literacy.
2. Learning clusters: Students take three or more connected courses, usually with a common interdisciplinary theme uniting them.
3. Freshman interest groups: Similar to learning clusters, but the students share the same major, and they often receive academic advising as part of the learning community.
4. Federated learning communities: Similar to a learning cluster, but with an additional seminar course taught by a "Master Learner", a faculty member who enrols in the other courses and takes them alongside the students. The Master Learner's course draws connections between the other courses.
5. Coordinated studies: This model blurs the lines between individual courses. The learning community functions as a single, giant course where the students and faculty members work full-time for an entire semester or academic year.

Micro-foundations are based on studies to understand how groups and teams increase their capabilities to work effectively together. If the organization is a puzzle, then the groups are pieces of the puzzle, putting them together makes it solid. describe organizational learning as a dynamic process, where new ideas and actions move from individuals to the organization and same time organization return feedback as data what have been learned and experienced in the past. Feed-back from the organization comes to the individual through groups and vice versa. They divided organizational learning into three levels where individual learning is based on intuiting and interpreting while group learning is based on interpreting and integrating, and finally, the organization is about institutionalizing. When these theses are compared with other scholars' studies, there can be found many similar exposes, also prove that groups are basic blocks which make a base for organizational learning. Although he claims that learning organizations work is based on several "lifelong programs of study and practice": First, it is based on the individual. In his opinion, all starts with a group member and his/her capability to expose the deepest desire. By that, a person can encourage others and he/herself to move towards the goals. Second is mental models, where individuals have to constitute reflect on their own thought and feel how they see and feel the world against their actions and how they affect their actions. The third one is all about sharing our visions. Basically, it is about how we can create a commitment in a group. Fourth is about group learning and how members can develop their intelligence and ability. The last one describes system thinking.

When studying many other scholars, there can be a basic red line of all these theories about organizational learnings. It all starts with individual tacit knowledge. Socializing that to another person transforms through externalization to explicit where it can be shared with a team and by arguing, internalising, and turning it into practice. This is the spiral that brings the organization to the learning path.

The basic of learning comes from the individual, and after sharing and debate it with other individuals, it became too aware. These individuals make together a group and sharing knowledge with other groups it comes to learning at the organizational level.

=== Living-Learning Communities ===
Residential learning communities, or living-learning communities (LLCs), are a type of academic intentional community which range from theme-based halls within a college dormitory to degree-granting residential colleges. What residential and nonresidential learning communities share is an intentional integration of academic content with daily interactions among students, faculty, and staff living and working in these programs.

Students who participate in LLCs tend to have higher GPAs, increased retention rates, and greater academic engagement compared to their peers living in traditional, non-themed residence halls.

== Results ==
Universities are often drawn to learning communities because research has shown that participation can improve student retention rate. Lisa Spanierman, Jason Soble, Jennifer Mayfield, Helen Neville, Mark Aber, Lydia Khuri & Belinda De La Rosa note in the Journal of Student Affairs Research and Practice that learning communities can have a much greater impact on students which including predicting greater academic interactions, and the development of a greater sense of community and belonging.

=== Retention rate ===
Comparing students that live on-campus in learning communities, and those that live off campus shows that students that participate in learning communities are more likely to persist to graduation. This is supported in supplementary scholarly literature through the work of Vince Tinto as he states "For example, social and academic systems that positively reinforce each other will increase student commitment such as when students are part of a peer group that also serves as a study group.

=== Sense of Community and Belonging ===
Learning communities have been shown to contribute to students' sense of community and belonging. Sense of belonging is understood as "a feeling that members have of belonging, a feeling that members matter to one another and to the group, and a shared faith that members’ needs will be met”. The importance of the development of a sense of belonging is outlined by Abraham Maslow as it is deemed a universal human need, and an essential element to health.

=== Academic Performance ===
Research conducted by John Purdie, and Vicki Rosser concluded that students who participated in learning communities earned higher grades, even when controlling for entering characteristics, and environmental characteristics. Universities are able to contribute to the increased academic performance of students what participate in a learning community because of its ability to predict greater peer academic experiences and an enriched learning environment. In a study conducted by Karen Inkelas of Northern Arizona University students that participate in academic based learning communities self-reported an increase in meeting learning outcomes.

== Approaches ==
- Online learning community
- Intergenerational equity
- Youth/adult partnerships

== See also ==
- Collaborative learning
- Community of practice
- Learning organization
- Online learning community
- Professional learning community
