= Institute for Information and Communications Technology Planning and Evaluation =

South Korea government organization

Institute for Information and communication Technology Planning and Evaluation
- 정보통신기획평가원
- Type: Public Sector
- Headquarters: Daejeon, Korea
- President: Seok Jebeom
- Budget: $1.8 billion
- Employees: 306
- Website: iitp.kr

The Institute for Information communication Technology Planning and Evaluation (정보통신기획평가원, IITP) is a South Korean government institution that manages ICT research and development (R&D) under the Ministry of Science and ICT (과학기술정보통신부, MSIT). Its main activities are setting ICT policy, ICT R&D management, and ICT HR Development. Since 2013, IITP has been developing the Test of Practical Competency in ICT (TOPCIT) for standardizing the ICT qualification in Korea.

== History ==
The IITP first began as the Institute of Information Technology Advancement when it merged with Information & Telecommunication Technology Promotion Center on April 4, 2014. Then it was annexed to National IT Promotion Agency on June 5 of the same year, changing the name to the Institute for Information and Communications Technology Planning and Evaluation.

== Primary Missions ==
- Strategies for mid- and long-term ICT R&D technologies and planning technologies
- ICT R&D policy research, information survey, analysis and service
- Agreement, assessment, and support to ICT technology development projects
- Promotion for propagation of R&D achievements, technology transfer and commercialization
- Promotion of technology value assessment and transactions
