= R&D management =

Occupation and discipline

R&D management is the discipline of designing and leading R&D processes, managing R&D organizations, and ensuring smooth transfer of new know-how and technology to other groups or departments involved in innovation.

== Definitions ==
R&D management can be defined as where the tasks of innovation management (i.e., creating and commercializing inventions) meet the tasks of technology management (i.e., external and internal creation and retention of technological know-how). It covers activities such as basic research, fundamental research, technology development, advanced development, concept development, new product development, process development, prototyping, R&D portfolio management, technology transfer, etc., but generally is not considered to include technology licensing, innovation management, IP management, corporate venturing, incubation, etc. as those are sufficiently independent activities that can be carried out without the presence of a R&D function in a firm.

== Management models ==
Few dedicated management models for R&D exist. Among the more popularized ones are Arthur D. Little's Third generation R&D management, the Development funnel, the Phase–gate model All these models are concerned with improving R&D performance and result productivity, managing R&D as a process, and providing the R&D function with an environment in which the inherent technological and market uncertainties can be managed.

The Path to Developing Successful New Products a joint research by MIT & McKinsey & Co. points out three key practices that can play critical role in R&D Management: Talk to the customer, Nurture a project culture, Keep it focused.

== R&D management tools ==
- Simultaneous Engineering
- TRIZ
- Voice of the customer
- PACE, Stage–gate model
- Technology intelligence

== Associations and communities ==
Journals:

- R&D Management Journal
- Technovation
- Research-Technology Management

Associations and communities

- RADMA, a R&D management society based in the UK
- IAMOT, the Int'l Association for the Management of Technology
- R&D and Innovation in China

== See also ==
- Global R&D management
- Innovation management
- New product development
- Open innovation
- Outline of management
- R&D
- Reverse innovation
- Technology management
