= Global R&D management =

Global R&D management is the discipline of designing and leading R&D processes globally, i.e. across borders, in multi-cultural and multi-lingual settings, and cutting across multiple time zones. In addition, managing R&D organizations, and ensuring smooth transfer of new know-how and technology to other groups or departments involved in innovation. Global R&D teams trade the benefits of collocation and centralization with the benefits of local responsiveness, local insight and global synergy.

Global R&D management today benefits the automotive, aerospace, medical, software and video game industries, among many others. In order for companies to achieve their objectives of a timely and cost-effective product development it often requires seeking resources outside the company confines. This can range from outsourcing non-core activities to co-development and collaboration.

== History ==
Industrial R&D has globalized since the 1950s, when e.g. the US company IBM started a research center in Europe, but it was not before the 1990s that global R&D reached noteworthy proportions in any firm. Access to local technology, access to local markets, and merger and acquisitions of parent companies led to a dispersion of R&D activities worldwide. Various estimates now put the average internationalization of R&D at 10% (for e.g. Japanese firms) to more than 50% (e.g. for many European and some US firms). Great variances among companies even within the same industry exist, indicating that there is no single normative strategy to determine the dispersion or globalization of R&D.

== Training ==
Global R&D Management requires that engineers, scientists and managers be trained for competence in cross-cultural communication, a skill not often taught in engineering schools. Practical Books on the topic include as Cross-Cultural Dialogues: 74 Brief Encounters with Cultural Difference” by Craig Storti. Practical workshops on communication with India are offered by Amritt, Inc and on China by Ionis International.

Global R&D management is concerned with the following sub-topics:

- virtual R&D management
- open innovation
- set-up and establishment of R&D centers
- R&D location decisions
- cross-border R&D project management
- technology transfer
- managing R&D networks
- post-merger integration of R&D units
- dissolution of R&D centers
- productivity and performance measurement of R&D

== Research centers ==
Locations considered to be excellent places to find these resources are India and China because they are also the locales where many new products are targeted. Companies such as General Electric have put up vast in-house research and development centers in emerging countries such as India. Establishing and running an offshore facility for R&D take a serious commitment of management bandwidth. Hundreds of American and European companies have found that this approach gives the best combination of security and long-term financial advantages.

- GLORAD, a Research Center and Think Tank for Global R&D Management and Reverse Innovation in Shanghai, China
- Center for Global Innovation Management at the Technical University of Hamburg, Germany
- Center for Global Innovation at the University of Southern California, Los Angeles, CA, USA

== Associations or communities ==
- R&D and Innovation in China
- Global R&D and Reverse Innovation

== See also ==
- R&D Management
- Globalization
