= Frugal innovation =

Process of reducing the complexity and cost of a good and its production

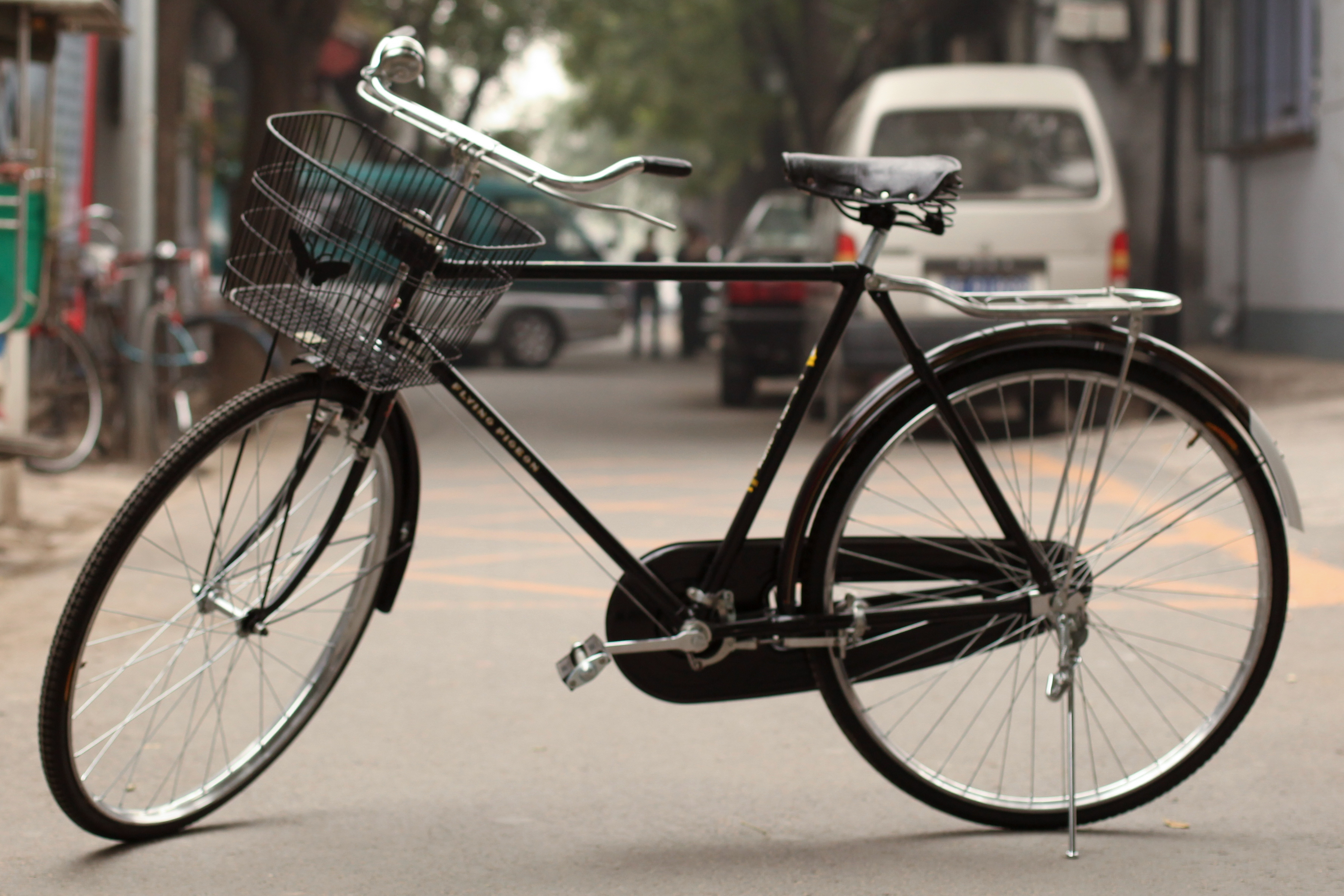
A Flying Pigeon in a hutong. A simpler single speed design inspired by a Raleigh

Frugal innovation or frugal engineering is the process of reducing the complexity and cost of a good and its production. Usually this refers to removing nonessential features from a durable good, such as a car or telephone, in order to sell it in developing countries. Designing products for such countries may also call for an increase in durability and, when selling the products, reliance on unconventional distribution channels. When trying to sell to so-called overlooked consumers (at the "bottom of the pyramid"), firms hope volume will offset small profit margins. Globalization and rising incomes in developing countries may also drive frugal innovation. Such services and products need not be of inferior quality but must be provided cheaply. While frugal innovation has been associated with good-enough performance, in some sectors such as in healthcare, frugal innovation must offer maximum performance without compromising on quality. Three defining criteria have been proposed to distinguish frugal innovation from other types of innovation: substantial cost reduction, concentration on core functionalities, and an optimised performance level. Rather than simply offering cheaper products, frugal innovations achieve significant cost savings by focusing on essential features while ensuring that the resulting performance level is carefully tailored to the specific needs of the target market.

In May 2012 The Financial Times newspaper called the concept "increasingly fashionable". In fact the topic has been covered by several books some with the expressions as the title.

Several US universities have programs that develop frugal solutions. Such efforts include the Frugal Innovation Lab at Santa Clara University and a two quarter project course at Stanford University, the Entrepreneurial Design for Extreme Affordability program. Research has also addressed how frugal innovations can be developed systematically; the objective–conflict–resolution (OCR) approach, for instance, supports this process through the structured resolution of conflicting objectives in the product development process.

== Variety of terms ==
Many terms are used to refer to the concept. "Frugal engineering" was coined by Carlos Ghosn, then joint chief of Renault and Nissan, who stated, "frugal engineering is achieving more with fewer resources."

In India, the words "Gandhian" or "jugaad", Hindi for a stop-gap solution, are sometimes used instead of "frugal". Other terms with allied meanings include "inclusive innovation", "catalytic innovation", "reverse innovation", and "bottom of the pyramid (BOP) innovation", etc.

At times this no frills approach can be a kind of disruptive innovation.

== History ==
Spotlighted in a 2010 article in The Economist, the roots of this concept may lie in the appropriate technology movement of the 1950s, although profits may have been first wrung from underserved consumers in the 1980s when multinational companies like Unilever began selling single-use-sized toiletries in developing countries. Frugal innovation today is not solely the domain of large, multinational corporations: small, local firms have themselves chalked up a number of homegrown solutions. While General Electric may win plaudits for its US$800 EKG machines, cheap cell phones made by local, no-name companies, and prosthetic legs fashioned from irrigation piping, are also examples of frugal innovation.

The concept has gained popularity in the South Asian region, particularly in India. The US Department of Commerce has singled out this nation for its innovative achievements, saying in 2012, "there are many Indian firms that have learned to conduct R&D in highly resource-constrained environments and who have found ways to use locally appropriate technology..."

In the process of the COVID-19 crisis, frugal strategies have been adopted by Western companies for the handling of increased uncertainty. Specific customer needs can be met with frugal solutions that perfectly fit an exceptional (temporal) situation.

== Notable innovations ==
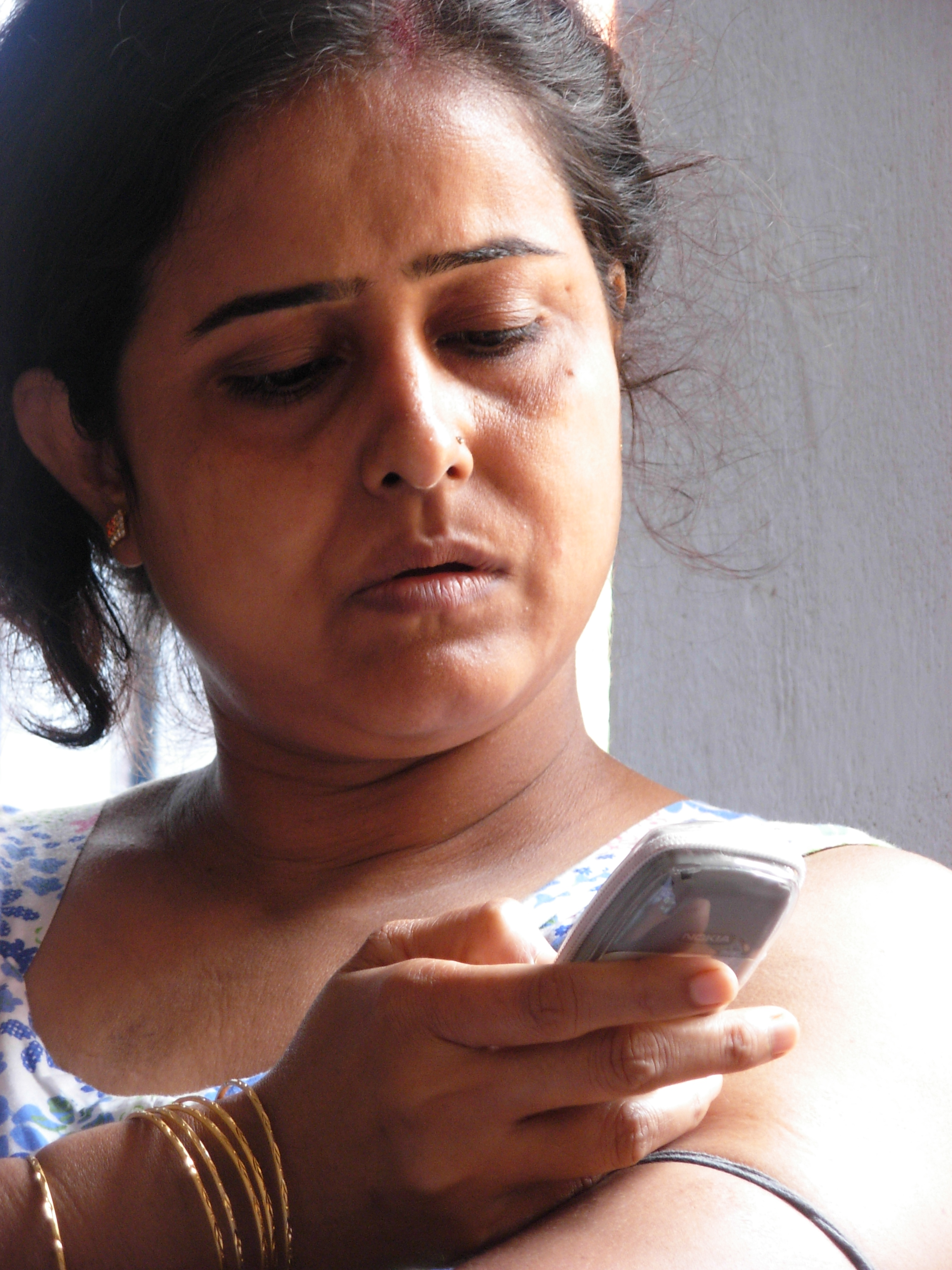
An Indian woman using her Nokia 1100

Frugal innovation is not limited to durable goods such as the GE US$800 EKG machine, Reliance Jio's JioPhone or the US$100 One Laptop Per Child but also includes services such as 1-cent-per-minute phone calls, mobile banking, off-grid electricity, and microfinance.

ChotuKool fridge
A tiny refrigerator sold by Indian company Godrej, the ChotuKool may have more in common with computer cooling systems than other refrigerators; it eschews the traditional compressor for a computer fan. (It may exploit the thermoelectric effect.)

Foldscope
Designed to cost no more than a dollar, the Foldscope is a tough origami microscope assembled from a sheet of paper and a lens. The Stanford engineer responsible more recently developed a string-and-cardboard contraption that can function similarly to $1,000 centrifuges.

Jaipur foot
A low-cost prosthetic developed in India, the Jaipur foot costs about $150 to manufacture and includes improvisations such as incorporating irrigation piping into the design to lower costs.

Mobile banking
Mobile banking solutions in Africa, like Safaricom's M-Pesa, allow people access to basic banking services from their mobile phones. Money transfers done through mobiles are also much cheaper than using a traditional method. While basic banking can be done on a mobile alone, deposits and withdrawals of cash necessitate a trip to a local agent.

Nokia 1100
Designed for developing countries, the Nokia 1100 was basic, durable, and–besides a flashlight–had few features other than voice and text. Selling more than 200 million units only four years after its 2003 introduction made it one of the best selling phones of all time.

Sorghum beer
In Africa, several companies including SABMiller and Diageo, following in the footsteps of local home brewers, have made beer more affordable by using sorghum or cassava in place of malting barley and reducing packaging costs by using kegs instead of bottles.

Solar light bulb
In some Philippine slums, solar skylights made from one-liter soda bottles filled with water and bleach can provide light equivalent to that produced by a 55 watt bulb and may reduce electricity bills by US$10 per month.

Tata Nano
Designed to appeal to the many Indians who drive motorcycles, the Tata Nano was developed by Indian conglomerate Tata Group and is the cheapest car in the world.

Fold-Illuminator
A paper-based device designed to support biochemistry and biotechnology applications. The Fold-Illuminator incorporates a USB powered heating element to incubate chemical reactions. It also incorporates LED lights and an acrylic filter to support fluorescence visualization. The device is modular such that only the fluorescent illuminator can be utilized for a cost of ~US$5, with an additional ~US$4 heating element add-on. This low-cost device provides the utility equivalent to laboratory equipment that cost >$10,000, with the added benefits of portability. Portions of the device can be recycled or composted while the electronic components can be reused.

Lung ventilator
Swiss coffee machine manufacturer Thermoplan developed in spring 2020 a functional ventilator within four weeks on request of Starbucks. The simplified machine used 80% coffee machine components and could be mass-produced in up to 800 units per week in the company's production facility at a quarter of the cost of an original ventilator. Unlike conventional devices, these are battery-powered, easy to use, and compact, hence, be used as a mobile unit in an ambulance.

== Sustainability and social impact ==
Frugal innovation is often associated with the efficient use of resources and with social inclusion, but the literature does not agree on its sustainability benefits. A literature review by Martin Albert concluded that frugal innovation is inherently socially and economically sustainable, but that ecological sustainability is not inherent, and proposed the term "ecological sustainable frugal innovation" for cases with a positive ecological connection. The OECD uses the term "inclusive innovation" for initiatives that directly serve the welfare of lower-income and excluded groups, and has reviewed policies to support them.

=== Local communities and the informal economy ===
Most examples in the literature come from firms, but frugal innovation also emerges within local communities. An ethnographic study of bamboo shoot processing in the informal food sector of Manipur, India, found that frugal innovations were the result of negotiations among different actors. Kate Meagher argues that, in Africa, frugal innovation models tend to treat informal economies as a pool of workers and resources for the benefit of corporate actors, using the cases of M-Pesa and micro-insurance.

== Criticism and limitations ==
Frugal innovation has also been criticised. A critical review by Mokter Hossain points to the lack of a clear definition, its overlap with related concepts, weak intellectual property protection, and geographical and authorship limitations in the research, as well as the limited social impact of many small-firm solutions.

Hossain also criticises products from multinational companies. He notes that the Tata Nano failed to meet minimum safety standards and that some units caught fire, and that single-use shampoo sachets create plastic waste.

The developmental impact of frugal innovation is debated. Advocates describe a "win-win" in which companies earn profits while reducing poverty, while critics argue that it increases exploitation and inequality; Knorringa and colleagues argue that an empirical approach is needed to assess where and when it supports inclusive development.

== In the media ==
In 2014, Navi Radjou delivered a talk at TED Global on frugal innovation.

In 2015, Navi Radjou and Jaideep Prabhu coauthored the book Frugal Innovation: How to Do More With Less, published worldwide by The Economist. The book explains the principles, perspectives and techniques behind frugal innovation, aiming to help managers to profit from the great changes ahead.

== See also ==
- C. K. Prahalad
- Market segmentation
- Open innovation
- Price discrimination
- Reverse innovation
- Small is beautiful
