= TOPCIT =

Computer-based performance evaluation test

Test of practical competency in ICT
- Acronym: TOPCIT
- Type: Computer-based test.
- Administrator: Ministry of Science and ICT / Institute for Information and Communications Technology Planning and Evaluation
- Skills tested: Competency in the technical and business field of ICT.
- Year started: 2014
- Duration: 2 hours 30 minutes
- Score range: 5 levels of competency (total of 0 to 1000)
- Score validity: 2 years
- Offered: twice a year.
- Fee: Free
- Website: https://www.topcit.or.kr/main/main.do?lang=US

The Test of Practical Competency in ICT (TOPCIT) is a performance-based evaluation designed to assess the skills and competencies of information technology specialists and software developers, focusing on the abilities required to perform effectively in professional roles.

TOPCIT was developed and is administered by Korea's Ministry of Science, ICT and Future Planning and the Institute for Information and Communications Technology Planning and Evaluation. They are government agencies that oversee and manage ICT related R&D, policy, and HR development.

== Background ==
Companies and higher education institutions voiced the need for a standardized and objective competency index that can reinforce the on-site competency of ICT/SW college students and narrow the gap between the viewpoints of industrial and academic circles regarding the qualifications of a competent specialist in the field.

=== Objective ===
To enhance the quality of ICT and software education at universities, address the manpower shortage faced by ICT companies, and expand the growth potential of ICT industries and educational systems, TOPCIT was developed to objectively assess the competencies of individuals planning to enter the ICT field. The analyzed results help universities make informed admissions decisions and assist companies in hiring new talent. TOPCIT evaluates competency by assessing test-takers’ responses to creative problem-solving questions as well as their practical execution skills.

=== Participating companies and universities ===
A total of 269 people from 231 companies and educational academies participated and founded the TOPCIT in August, 2013. Through mutual development of companies and academies, TOPCIT was made with an objective of closing the gap between the industry and academic circles regarding the practical qualifications of a competent specialist in this field. Through the systematic network between companies and schools, the gap between the demand of skilled workers that companies want and the skilled workers that the educational academies graduate will also be closed.

== Contents ==
TOPCIT has a total of 65 questions with up to 1,000 points. There are 4 types of questions in the test: multiple choice, short answer, descriptive writing, and critical thinking questions. There is a technical field and business field in the TOPCIT.

=== Technical field ===
The technical field tests the ability of software development, database design and operation, and the understanding and utilization of network security.

1. Software: The software module tests understanding of software, ability to analyze and design software, develop and test software, manage software, and implement integrated technology.
2. Database: The database module tests the knowledge of concepts and structure of database, ability to design, program, and operate database, and the understanding of database applications.
3. Network and security: this module tests knowledge of network concepts, network infrastructure technology, network application technology, IT security, ability-run IT security, and the knowledge of the latest IT security technology and standards.

=== Business field ===
The business field tests understanding IT business, technical communication skills, and project management.

1. IT business: this module consists of understanding IT business and utilizing IT business
2. Technical communication: this module consists of understanding business communications and utilizing technical documentation.
3. Project management: this module consists of understanding of project, project management, and project tools and evaluation.

== Test scores ==
There are five TOPCIT competency levels:

Level	Category (points)	Description
1	Novice (0~99 points)	The examinee requires more intensive study and training as he/she lacks knowledge and understanding of both technical and business field of ICT.
2	Advanced beginner (100~399 points)	The examinee only has an understanding of the theory and practice in the technical and business field of ICT.
3	Competent (400~699 points)	The examinee is capable of resolving tasks by applying the theory and practice from technical and business fields of ICT
4	Proficient (700~899 points)	The examinee is capable of resolving more complicated, profound tasks by applying knowledge and practice from the technical and business field of ICT.
5	Expert (900~1000 points)	The examinee is capable of playing a leading role in resolving tasks by applying theory and practice from the technical and business field of ICT and coming up with innovative measures based on their own creativity.
