= Vijay Govindarajan =

Indian-American academic

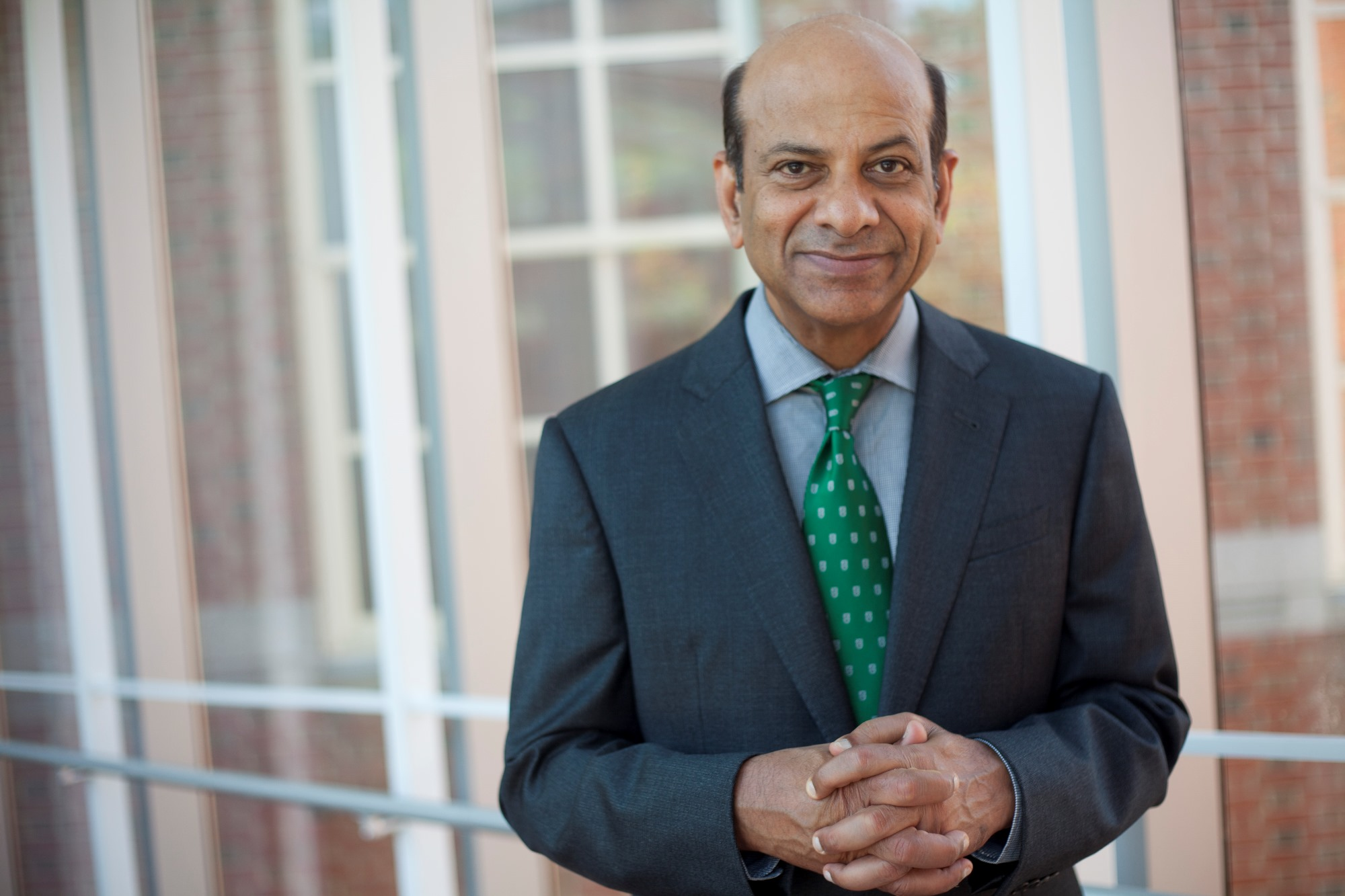
- Govindarajan in 2013
- Born: 18 November 1949 (age 76); Chennai, Tamilnadu, India
- Education: Harvard Business School (MBA, DBA); The Institute of Chartered Accountants of India
- Occupations: Professor and consultant
- Known for: Three Box Solution; Reverse Innovation
- Spouse: Kirthi (m. 1980)
- Children: 2
- Awards: Fellow at the Strategic Management Society; Two-time winner of the McKinsey award for the best article published in Harvard Business Review
- Website: www.tuck.dartmouth.edu/people/vg/

Vijay Govindarajan (born 18 November 1949), is the Coxe Distinguished Professor (a Dartmouth-wide chair) at Dartmouth College's Tuck School of Business and Marvin Bower Fellow, 2015–16 at Harvard Business School.

== Education ==
In 1974, Govindarajan received his chartered accountancy degree, where he was awarded the President's gold medal by the Institute of Chartered Accountants of India, the award is given to the first-ranked student of chartered accountancy in India. Govindarajan went on to earn his M.B.A. from Harvard Business School in 1976 where he graduated with distinction. Two years later, he earned his D.B.A. from Harvard Business School where he was awarded the Robert Bowne Prize For Best Thesis Proposal.

== Career ==
Govindarajan started his career as a professor at the Indian Institute of Management, Ahmedabad where he served as an associate professor from 1978 to 1980. From 1980 to 1985, Govindarajan served as a visiting associate professor at Harvard University and as an associate professor at Ohio State University. In 1985, he joined the Tuck School of Business as a professor, where he has taught ever since. During his time at Tuck, Govindarajan has also served as a visiting professor at INSEAD's Fontainebleau campus and the International University of Japan.

Govindarajan served as General Electric's first Chief Innovation Consultant and Professor in Residence from 2008 to 2010. While working at General Electric, Govindarajan co-authored a paper entitled "How GE Is Disrupting Itself" with Chris Trimble and GE's CEO Jeffrey Immelt. "How GE Is Disrupting Itself," which introduced the idea of reverse innovation.

In 2024, Govindarajan signed a faculty letter expressing support for Dartmouth College president Sian Beilock, who ordered the arrests of 90 students and faculty members nonviolently protesting the Gaza war.

== Scholarly work ==
Govindarajan is the author of fourteen books and has published articles in academic journals such as the Academy of Management Journal, the Academy of Management Review and the Strategic Management Journal. In 2010, Govindarajan's article "Stop The Innovation Wars" received the second place prize for that year's McKinsey Awards. His article "Engineering Reverse Innovations" won the McKinsey Award for the Best Article published in HBR in 2015.

== Selected publications ==
- “Design Products That Won’t Become Obsolete”, Harvard Business Review, November–December 2024 (with T. T. Eapen and D. J. Finkenstadt)
- Fusion Strategy, Harvard Business Review Press, 2024 (with Venkat Venkataraman).
- The Three Box Solution: A Strategy For Leading Innovation, HBR Press, April 2016
- Reverse Innovation: Create Far From Home, Win Everywhere, Harvard Business Review Press, 2012 (with Chris Trimble).
- “Becoming a Better Corporate Citizen: How PepsiCo Moved Toward A Healthier Future” (with Indra K. Nooyi), Harvard Business Review, March–April 2020.
- “Engineering Reverse Innovation”, Harvard Business Review, July-Aug 2015 (with Amos Winter)
- “Building a $300 House for The Poor,” Harvard Business Review, March 2011.
- “The CEO’s Role in Business Model Reinvention” Harvard Business Review, January 2011, 89(1- 2), (with Chris Trimble).
- “Reverse Innovation, Emerging Markets, and Global Strategy”, Global Strategy Journal, 2011, pp. 191–205.
- “Stop the Innovation Wars” Harvard Business Review, July 2010, 88(7), pp. 76–83 (with Chris Trimble).
- "How GE Is Disrupting Itself," Harvard Business Review, October 2009, 87(10), pp. 56–65 (with Jeffrey Immelt and Chris Trimble).
