= Bunn-O-Matic Corporation =

American beverage equipment manufacturer

- Company type: Private
- Industry: Appliance manufacturing
- Founded: 1957
- Founder: George R. Bunn
- Headquarters: Springfield, Illinois, U.S.
- Key people: Brad Willis (CEO and President)
- Products: Home and commercial appliances
- Owner: WelBilt
- Website: www.bunn.com

Bunn-O-Matic Corporation is an American manufacturer of dispensed beverage equipment (including coffee and tea) headquartered in Springfield, Illinois, with a plant in Creston, Iowa. Currently, the corporation's products are sold under the BUNN and Bunn-O-Matic brands. The current president and CEO is Brad Willis.

Bunn is the American distributor of the Tiger Super Automatic Espresso Machine, made by Thermoplan AG.

== History ==
The company was founded in 1957 by George R. Bunn, who designed his own versions of paper coffee filters, that had a flat bottom and fluted sides and pour-over drip coffee brewers.

The company introduced its first automatic drip-brew coffee maker in 1963. The company introduced its first drip brewer for the home market in 1972.

On June 26, 2020, a Bunn plant in Springfield, Illinois, became the scene of a workplace shooting in which an employee fatally shot three coworkers before fleeing and committing suicide at another location. The motive remains unclear, according to police.

== Products ==
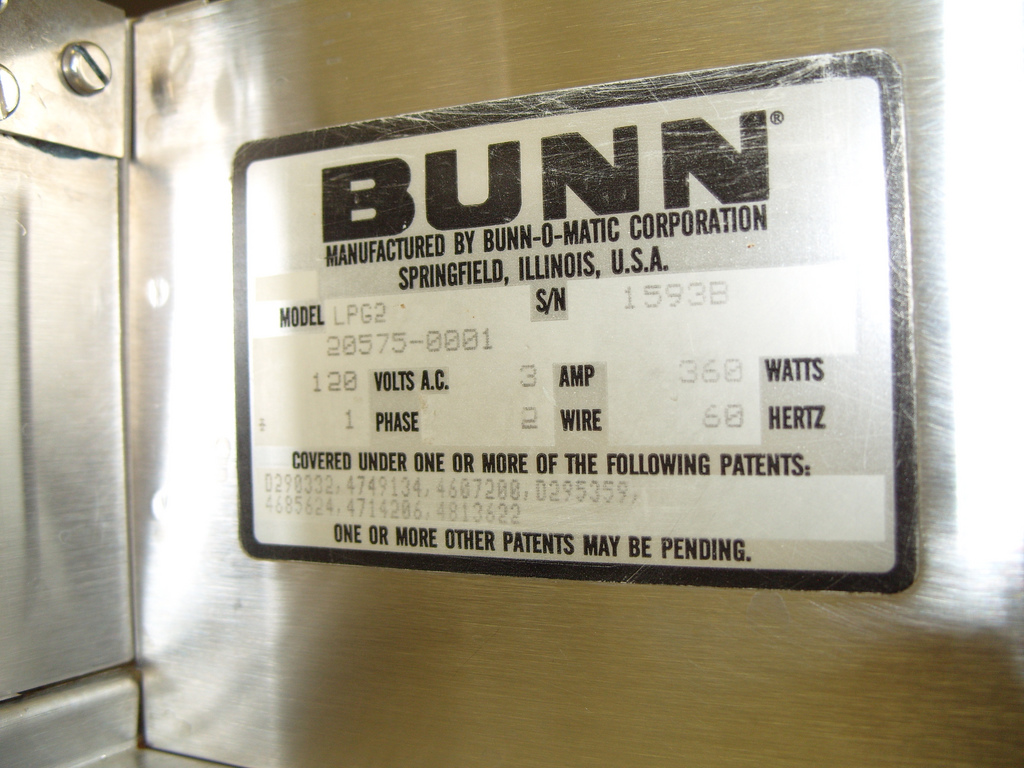
Close-up of the Bunn label on a coffee grinder

Bunn-O-Matic offers commercial and domestic food products and accessories. The commercial sector includes several products for brewing and dispensing coffee, tea, water, and other filters. It is common to find touchscreens and USB ports for programming on commercial models.

The company sells a coffee pod brewer system similar to Keurig K-Cups, and makes various home and domestic coffee makers under the Speed Brew and Heat N' Brew families. Bunn also provides specialty foods for order or pick-up at Pease's Stores, including steaks, soups, and snacks.
