= Thermoplan AG =

Kitchen appliance manufacturer

Thermoplan AG is a manufacturer of kitchen appliances for the restaurant sector. The headquarters of the company are located in Weggis (LU), Switzerland.

== History ==
Thermoplan was founded in 1974 by Domenic Steiner. The company's main products are modular super-automatic espresso machines. The medium-sized firm employs 125 employees.

The company's major breakthrough came in 1999, when it was chosen by the international coffeehouse chain Starbucks as their exclusive espresso machine supplier.

In 2004, global corporations including McDonald's and IKEA began using Thermoplan equipment. In the same year, Thermoplan was awarded the 2004 Innovation Award from the Central Swiss Chamber of Commerce.

The company spent 1.6 million Swiss francs (US$1.3 million; €980,000) persuading Brazil's national soccer team to choose Weggis for its training camp before the 2006 World Cup. A practice ground in Weggis was turned into a temporary 5,000-seat arena called the "Thermoplan Arena".

The company employs around 420 people at the Weggis site in 2021 and sells its coffee machines in 80 countries worldwide. Thermoplan AG has an export share of 98%. From September 2021, the construction of Plant 5 will begin using the latest technologies.

== Coffee and Espresso Machines ==
=== Verismo 801 and Thermoplan Black & White ===
The Verismo 801 was a superautomatic coffee machine designed exclusively for Starbucks, until discontinued in 2008. The Verismo 801 was released to the commercial market shortly before it was discontinued, under the Black and White CTS2 brand name. It features dual bean hoppers and is capable of pulling both single, double and half-caff espresso. It also has a steam wand with automatic temperature probe (for programmable auto-shutoff), and hot water spout. All functions are operated by the button control panel on the front of the device.

The Thermoplan CT1 and Thermoplan CTM are designed for operation by untrained workers; they feature an inbuilt milk-frother drawing milk from an internal milk fridge, that allows for complete one-click beverage making. The machine includes pre-set programs for latte, cappuccino, espresso, black coffee and white coffee although it can be configured with the Thermoplan Service Master Card.

=== Mastrena, Tiger, and Black & White 2 ===
Thermoplan manufactures the Mastrena, the super-automatic machine made exclusively for Starbucks. The Mastrena is an upgrade of the Verismo 801, using some of the same components, and some face-lifted. The machine is smaller in size than the Verismo 801, due to the concerns of Starbucks CEO Howard Schultz that the height of the Verismo 801 prevented baristas from interacting with customers. The machine has all the features of its predecessor, including a larger dual bean hopper, as well as the ability to pull ristretto and lungo shots.

Thermoplan also produces The Tiger, a lower-volume espresso machine with a similar modular design, distributed by Bunn in the United States, and the Black & White 2, an upgrade to the Black & White line of espresso machines, combining the main features found on the Thermoplan Verismo 801 and the Thermoplan Tiger. The B&W 2 is also sold as part of both Starbucks and Costa Coffee licensing programs in the UK.

Images
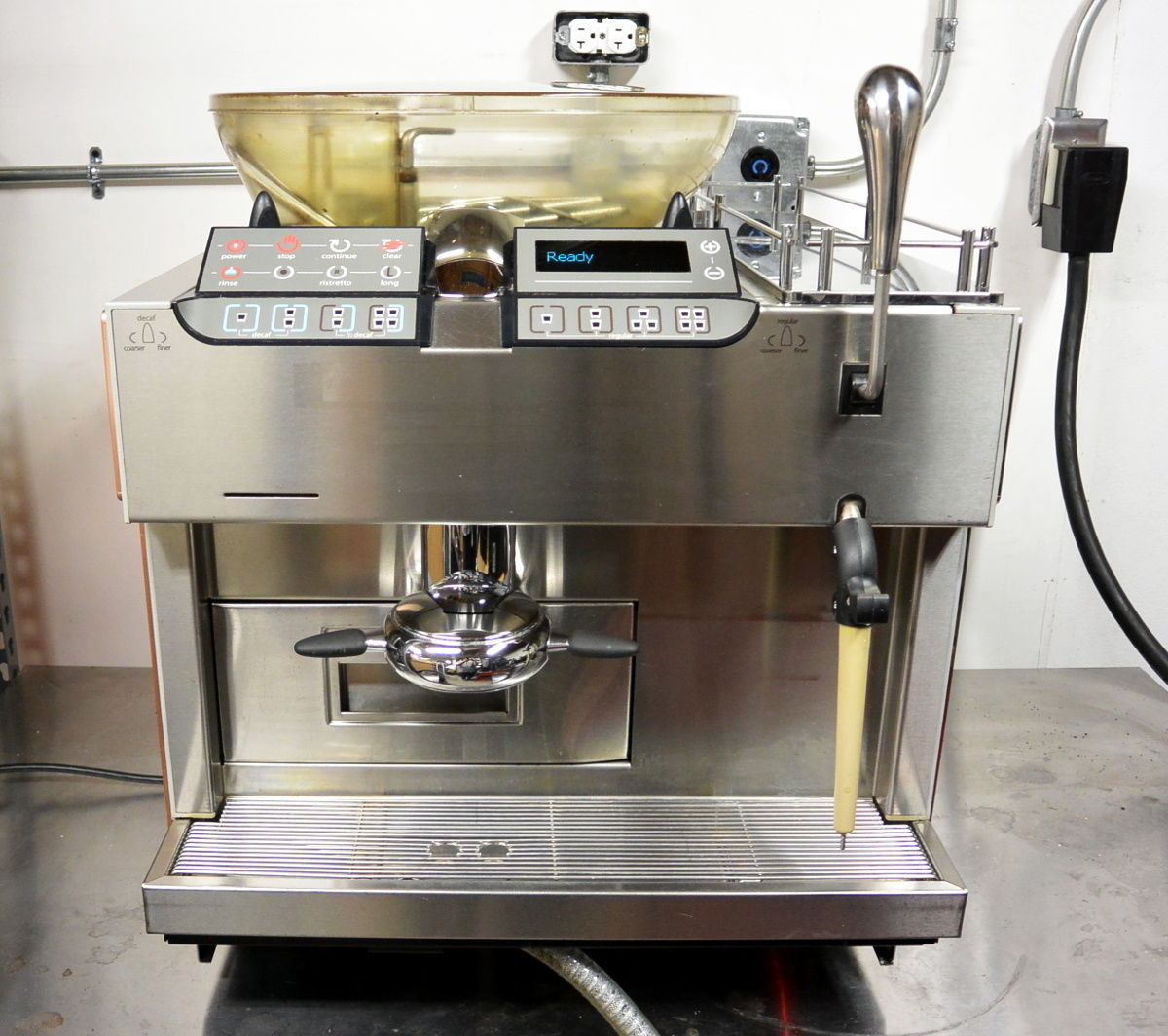
Image showing the Mastrena Espresso Machine used exclusively in Starbucks.

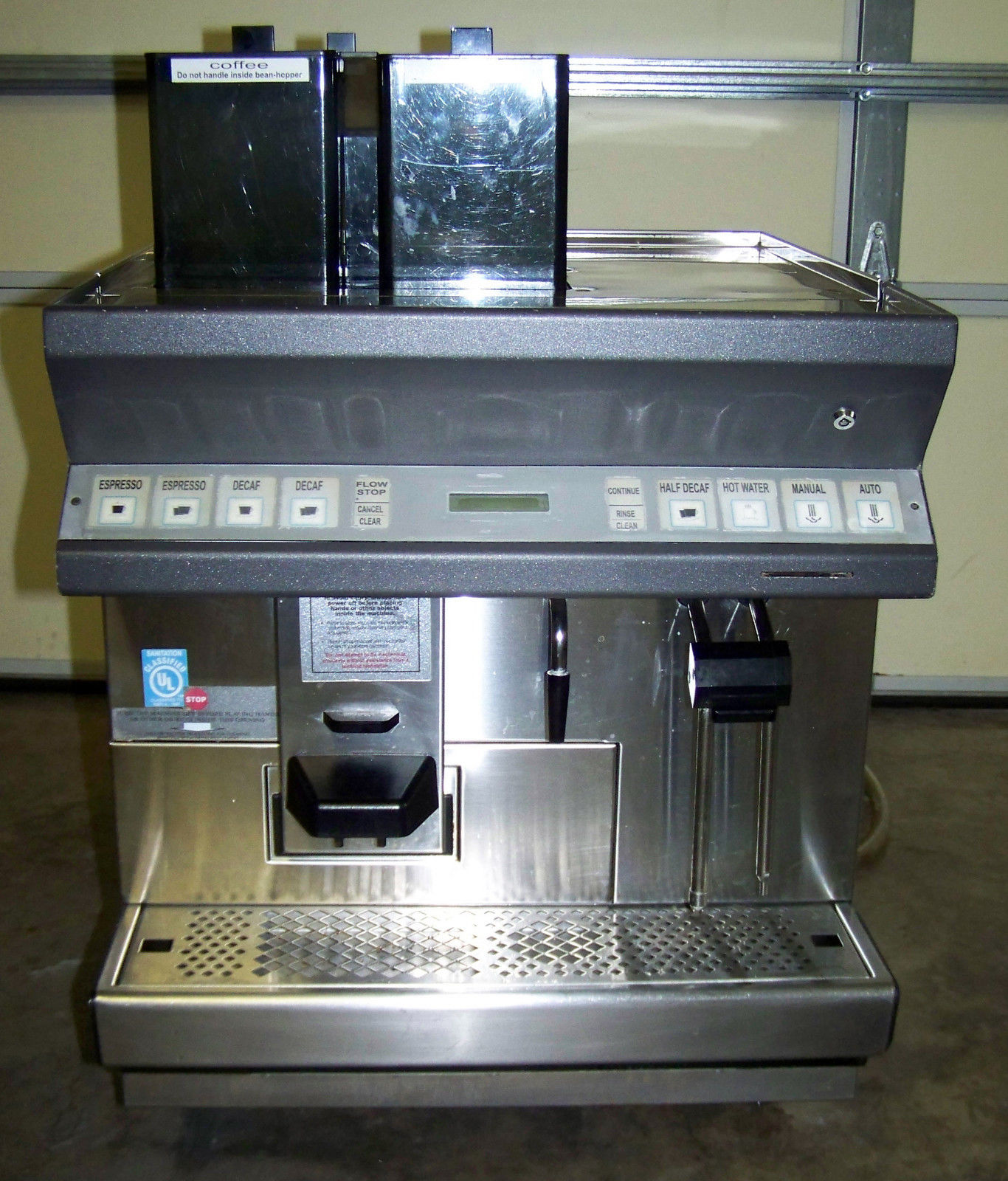
Image showing the Verismo 801 Espresso Machine, used in Starbucks.

=== Black&White4 ===
Thermoplan now offers the B&W4 line in the US through importers.
