= Reverse innovation =

Macroeconomic concept

Reverse innovation or trickle-up innovation is an innovation seen or used first in the developing world, before spreading to the industrialized world. The term was popularized by Dartmouth professors Vijay Govindarajan and Chris Trimble and General Electric's Jeffrey R. Immelt. Subsequently, Vijay Govindarajan and Chris Trimble published the book Reverse Innovation.

Reverse innovation is the process whereby goods developed as inexpensive models to meet the needs of developing nations, such as battery-operated medical instruments in countries with limited infrastructure, are then repackaged as low-cost innovative goods for Western buyers.

The concept has also been used in the context of sustainability as a way for emerging countries to direcly and actively contribute to the achievement of the Sustainable Development Goals (SDGs) through businesses. In that sense, the health sector has been developing reverse innovation as a way to lower costs and expand health care in emerging nations.

== Definition ==
The concept of reverse innovation is a result of the evolution of different studies that sought to understand the relationship between emerging countries, high-income countries, and innovation. As such, the process of reverse innovation is defined as the one in which an innovation appears in an emerging country to address a local constraint, but has also the potential to address the same constraint in high-income countries. Once products are developed for these emerging markets, they are then sold elsewhere at low prices, which creates new markets and uses for these innovations.

Typically, companies start their globalization efforts by removing expensive features from their established product, and attempt to sell these de-featured products in the developing world. This approach is not very competitive and targets only the most affluent segments of society in these developing countries. Reverse innovation, on the other hand, leads to products which are created locally in developing countries, tested in local markets, and, if successful, then upgraded for sale and delivery in the developed world.

Later scholarship broadened the definition beyond where a product is first sold. Max von Zedtwitz and his colleagues split innovation into four phases (which were ideation, development, introduction in a primary market, and introduction into a secondary market), and they argued that any and all of them can take place in a country that is up and coming. Their typology identifies 16 possible flows between advanced and up-and-coming countries, 10 of which count as reverse innovation, divided into "weak" and "strong" forms, depending on how many phases occur within the country that is up-and-coming.

The term 'reverse innovation' was constructed by a series of complimentary studies. Originally defined differently as innovation blowback by John Hagel III and John Seely Brown in their 2005 McKinsey Quarterly article titled Innovation blowback: Disruptive management practices from Asia. In essence, the authors warn that:

The periphery of today's global business environment is where innovation potential is the highest. Edges define and describe the borders of companies, markets, industries, geographical areas, intellectual disciplines, and generations. They are where unmet customer needs find unexpected solutions, where disruptive innovations and blue oceans get birthed, and where edge capabilities transform the core competencies of the corporation.

C.K. Prahalad explains that there are five ways in which resource-starved developing countries lead rich nations:

1. Affordability
2. Leapfrog technologies
3. Service ecosystems
4. Robust systems
5. Add-on applications

These very deprivations are catalysts for reverse innovation.

Considering the profitability potential of reverse innovation, research has been developed to point the main causes of success in the implementation of reverse innovation in multi-national corporations. The adoption of local growth teams (LGTs) helps companies understand the local needs of emerging countries, and incorporating local resources for the development of a solution helps reduce costs for companies. Innovation is more successful when it addresses an unmet need caused by environmental constraints in the production process instead of adapting an existing solution. By adopting these strategies, companies are more likely to successfully implement reverse innovation and become more adaptable and flexible in the face of market challenges than their competitors.

== Sustainable Development ==
Innovation has been considered a possible tool for the development of responsible management in businesses, as it encapsulates the need for new ideas on how to run company strategy (marketing, product, supply chain and processes). However, it was thought that innovation only flowed from the developed countries to the emerging ones as an external form of help to address their own issues. Nowadays, developed and emerging countries are both recognized as active actors in achieving the Sustainable Development Goals, and reverse innovation shows how the Global South can help directly in providing solutions to the challenges faced by the Global North.

Sustainability can be achieved when an activity causes a positive environmental, economic and social impact, in a configuration known as the triple bottom line of sustainable management. In that sense, frugal innovation is a type of innovation in which the objective is to increase the efficiency of a process, "doing more with less". This kind of innovation is often used in the context of sustainability, as it seeks to eliminate waste and maximize resources. This definition considers reverse innovation to be the successful implementation of a frugal innovation that is developed in an emerging country and successfully exported to a high-income country.

Reverse innovation is more likely to emerge in startups or entrepreneurs that are linked to the issues they wish to address, themselves having lived through it, as they know closely what are some of the gaps that may hinder the adoption of sustainable practices. in addition, a company's overall infrastructure will affect its ability to develop sustainable reverse innovation, as it may facilitate or stagnate the process of exporting the solutions. Finally, articulations between private investors, public initiatives, and partnerships with non-governmental organizations to support this kind of innovation help finance its development and implementation.

Frugal and reverse innovation strategies that are incorporated from the beginning on business models tend to show results in all of the triple bottom line components. From an economic perspective, those innovations allow for more job opportunities and the participation of women in entrepreneurial initiatives. That also translates to a social perspective, as people have access to work and the cost of products and services are lowered, allowing for investment in education and health. The impact also involves the environment, as innovations can be focused on reducing water waste and pollution, and improving the circular economy.

== In Global Health Systems ==
Reverse innovation has been identified as a key emerging trend in global health systems. Key health areas where low-income countries can offer solutions to medium and high-income country settings include:

- Rural health service delivery
- Skills substitution
- Decentralisation of management
- Creative problem-solving
- Education on communicable disease control
- Innovations in mobile phone use
- Low-technology simulation training
- Local product manufacturing
- Health financing
- Social entrepreneurship

System-wide benefits may also be seen as accruing across every part of the World Health Organization Health Systems Framework, specifically the six building blocks of health systems:

1. Service delivery
2. Health workforce
3. Health information
4. Medical products, vaccines, and technologies
5. Health financing
6. Health leadership and governance

In 2012, the journal "Globalization and Health" launched a series on reverse innovation. A 2020 review of the series found that it had produced theoretical models of reverse innovation as well as knowledge diffusion. However, such empirically grounded examples were still very rare, and it called for the documentation of well-evaluated attempts at each stage of the innovation pathway.

== Other Examples ==
Examples of reverse innovation can be found across various industries and geographies:

- As of 2009, Nokia had tested new business models for classified ads in Kenya; it also created new features in its hand-held phones sold in the US, based on observations of how phones are shared in Ghana.
- Microsoft created new phone app services for "dumb" phones which allow users with existing, non-smartphone devices to access Web sites such as Twitter, Facebook. Built for markets in India and South Africa, the apps were seen in 2009 as having potential as a low-cost cloud computing platform.
- As of 2009, GE HealthCare sold an ultra-portable electrocardiograph machine in the U.S. at an 80% markdown for similar products. The machine was originally built for doctors in India and China.
- In 2009, Tata Motors planned to sell an upgraded version of the Tata Nano in western markets, but it never went into production. Although the Nano initially appeared ready, even when it came to highly developed and advanced markets, it suffered setbacks after 2008-09, which included a forced relocation of its factory, delivery delays, and reports of cars catching on fire. Its marketing as the "world's cheapest car" linked it with low social status in India, and it failed to meet basic UN safety requirements for the European market, scoring zero stars in Global NCAP crash tests.
- In 2010, Philips released the first version of an air-purifying device and marketed it as an essential purchase to ensure health and quality of life. Created to address the issue of deteriorating air quality in cars, which appeared to be a growing concern for Chinese drivers, the technology quickly dispersed throughout other regions such as Japan, the United States and Europe.
- Procter & Gamble found that a honey-based cold remedy created for Mexico also had a profitable market in Europe and the United States.
- Nestlé learned that it could sell its low-cost, low-fat dried noodles originally created for rural India and position the same product as a healthy alternative in Australia and New Zealand.
- In healthcare, Health City Cayman Islands is a hospital (located on the Cayman Islands) that uses low-cost, high-performance methods based on the model of India's Narayana Hrudayalaya. This hospital has been cited as an example of an innovation from a low- or middle-income country being adapted for a high-income setting.

Reverse innovations may or may not be disruptive innovations.

== Criticism and Terminology ==
The term "reverse innovation" has been heavily criticized, especially as it relates to global health. This is because calling the flow "reverse" implies that innovation normally moves from rich countries to poor ones.

A 2016 qualitative study, led by US experts, found that the label can make policymakers dubious to adopting ideas from poorer and less developed nations. It can also suggest that such ideas come from necessity and the need to be frugal as opposed to quality, which may undermine adoption. The authors called the term a paradox: it challenges assumptions about which way knowledge flows while reinforcing them.

The meaning also differs between fields. In management literature, reverse innovation refers to a strategy in which a multinational company develops and innovations within its own organization. In healthcare policy, the term generally refers to the adoption of ideas and innovations that originated in low-income countries. Proposed alternatives for the term include co-development, bidriectional learning, mutual reciprocity, and global innovation flow.
