= Research and development =

General term for activities in connection with corporate or governmental innovation

Cycle of research and development

Spending on research and development as share of GDP (2015)

Research and development (R&D or R+D), also known as Research and Technical (or Technological) Development (RTD), is the set of innovative activities undertaken by corporations, wealthy industrialists, or governments in developing new services or products. R&D constitutes the first stage of development of a potential new service or the production process.

Although R&D activities may differ across businesses, the primary goal of an R&D department is to develop new products and services to answer questions, solve problems, and drive innovation.

R&D differs from the vast majority of corporate activities in that it is not intended to yield immediate profit, and generally carries greater risk and an uncertain return on investment.

R&D is crucial for acquiring larger shares of the market through new products. R&D&I represents R&D with innovation.

== Background ==
Researchers in rd per million people

New product design and development is often a crucial factor in the survival of a company. In a global industrial landscape that is changing fast, firms must continually revise their design and range of products. This is necessary as well due to the fierce competition and the evolving preferences of consumers. Without an R&D program, a firm must rely on strategic alliances, acquisitions, and networks to tap into the innovations of others.

In the context of commerce, "research and development" normally refers to future-oriented, longer-term activities in science or technology, using similar techniques to scientific research but directed toward desired outcomes with broad forecasts of commercial yield. In the United States, a typical ratio of research and development for an industrial company is about 3.5% of revenues; this measure is called "R&D intensity". A high technology company, such as a computer manufacturer, might spend 7% or a pharmaceutical companies such as Merck & Co. 14.1% or Novartis 15.1%. Anything over 15% is remarkable, and usually gains a reputation for being a high technology company such as engineering company Ericsson 24.9%, or biotech company Allergan, which tops the spending table with 43.4% investment. A system driven by marketing is one that puts the customer's needs first, and produces goods that are known to sell. Market research is carried out, which establishes the needs of consumers and the potential niche market of a new product.

Research and development has been widely linked to productivity growth, though the relationship is complex, depends on economic policies and innovation incentives and varies across industries. Investing in R&D is found to be positively associated with profitability, as well as higher productivity, as shown in studies conducted by the National Bureau of Economics. Research from 2000 has shown that firms with a persistent R&D strategy outperform those with an irregular or no R&D investment program. Measuring the effects of R&D can be difficult due to knowledge spillovers and changes in innovation. Statistics on organizations devoted to "R&D" may express the state of an industry, the degree of competition or the lure of progress. Data regarding patents are often used as a measure of the effects of R&D, however they do not capture all forms of innovation. Some other common measures include: budgets, and on rates of peer-reviewed publications. Bank ratios are one of the best measures, because they are continuously maintained, public and reflect risk.

== Business R&D ==
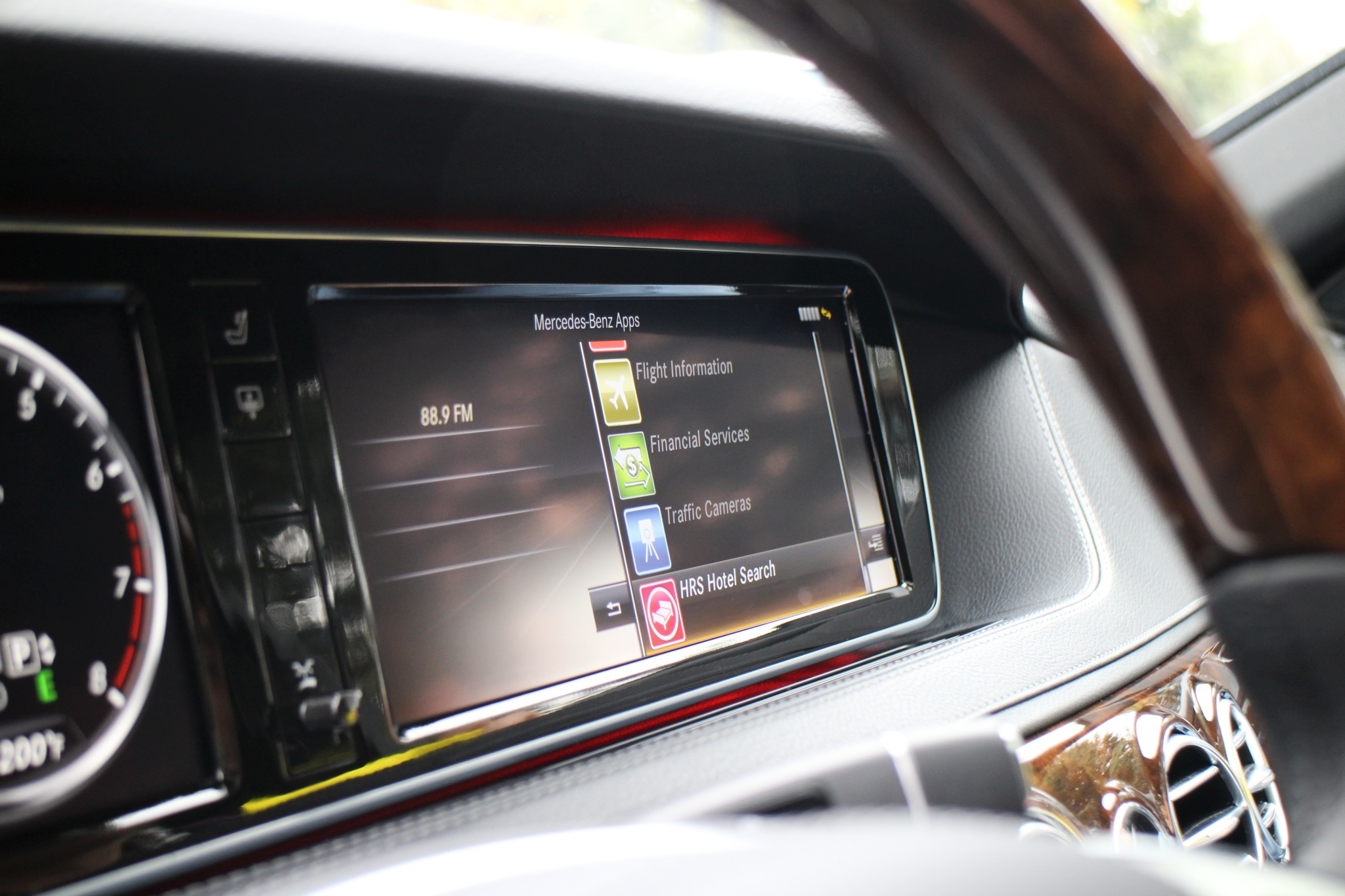
Mercedes Benz Research Development North America (13896037060)

=== Benefit by sector ===
In general, it has been found that there is a positive correlation between the research and development and firm productivity across all sectors, but that this positive correlation is much stronger in high-tech firms than in low-tech firms. In research done by Francesco Crespi and Cristiano Antonelli, high-tech firms were found to have "virtuous" Matthew effects while low-tech firms experienced "vicious" Matthew effects, meaning that high-tech firms were awarded subsidies on merit while low-tech firms most often were given subsidies based on name recognition, even if not put to good use. While the strength of the correlation between R&D spending and productivity in low-tech industries is less than in high-tech industries, studies have been done showing non-trivial spillover effects to other parts of the marketplace by low-tech R&D. Even if low-tech firms do not produce a large breakthrough, they can still increase their "absorptive capacity," which improves their ability to glean knowledge from their surroundings and apply them to new endeavors.

=== Risks ===
Research and development is difficult to manage, since the defining feature of research is that the researchers do not know in advance exactly how to accomplish the desired result. As a result, "higher R&D spending does not guarantee more creativity, higher profit or a greater market share". Research is the most risky financing area because both the development of an invention and its successful realization carries uncertainty including the profitability of the invention. Business R&D is risky for at least two reasons. The first source of risks comes from R&D nature, where an R&D project could fail without residual values. The second source of risks comes from takeover risks, which means R&D is appealing to bidders because they could gain technologies from acquisition targets. Therefore, firms may gain R&D profit that co-moves with takeover waves, causing risks to the company which engages in R&D activity. One way entrepreneurs can reduce these uncertainties or risks is to buy the license for a franchise, so that the know-how is already incorporated in the license. This is considered "external knowledge acquisition." However, as noted by Cassiman and Veugelers (2006), while buying external technology can reduce uncertainty, it is still often the most effective when used to complement, rather than completely replace, a firm's internal R&D activities.

=== Global ===
Since the 1960s, private businesses in the U.S. have provided an increasing share of funding for research and development, as direct federal funding waned.

Global R&D management is the discipline of designing and leading R&D processes globally, across cultural and lingual settings, and the transfer of knowledge across international corporate networks. Gassmann and von Zedtwitz (1999) identify five ways in which research and development takes shape in the international sphere. Most simply, there is ethnocentric centralized R&D, through which all efforts are kept within a country in order to preserve said country's technological benefits. Geocentric centralized R&D efforts are still physically located within said home country, but the company or party of interest is interested in more global perspectives and collaboration. Third, there is polycentric decentralized R&D, in which R&D labs are spread out and each serves its own market or community. The fourth global R&D shape described by Gassmann and von Zedtwitz (1999) is the "R&D hub model," where a strong centralized authority delegates tasks to "spokes" around the world. Finally, there are integrated R&D networks, which are the most modern form of global research and development. Through these integrated networks, research hubs are interconnected all around the world and knowledge flows in all directions.

== Government expenditures ==
=== United States ===
Former President Barack Obama requested $147.696 billion for research and development in FY2012, 21% of which was destined to fund basic research. According to National Science Foundation in U.S., in 2015, R&D expenditures performed by federal government and local governments are 54 and 0.6 billions of dollars. The federal research and development budget for fiscal year 2020 was $156 billion, 41.4% of which was for the Department of Defense (DOD). DOD's total research, development, test, and evaluation budget was roughly $108.5 billion. R&D spending for the US in 2023 was $937 billion, with $138 billion allocated for basic research, $174 billion for applied research $625 billion for experimental development.

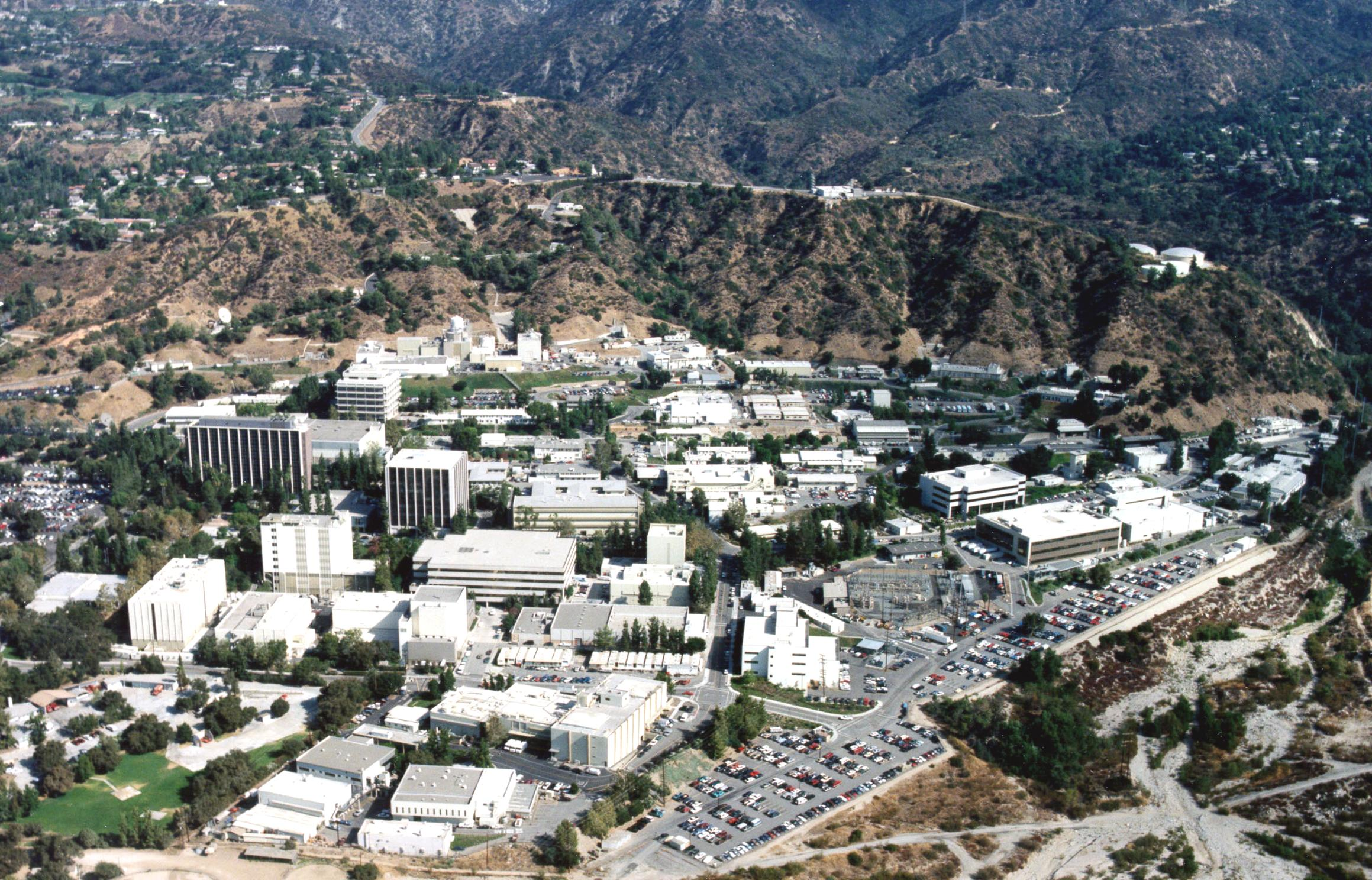
The Jet Propulsion Laboratory, California

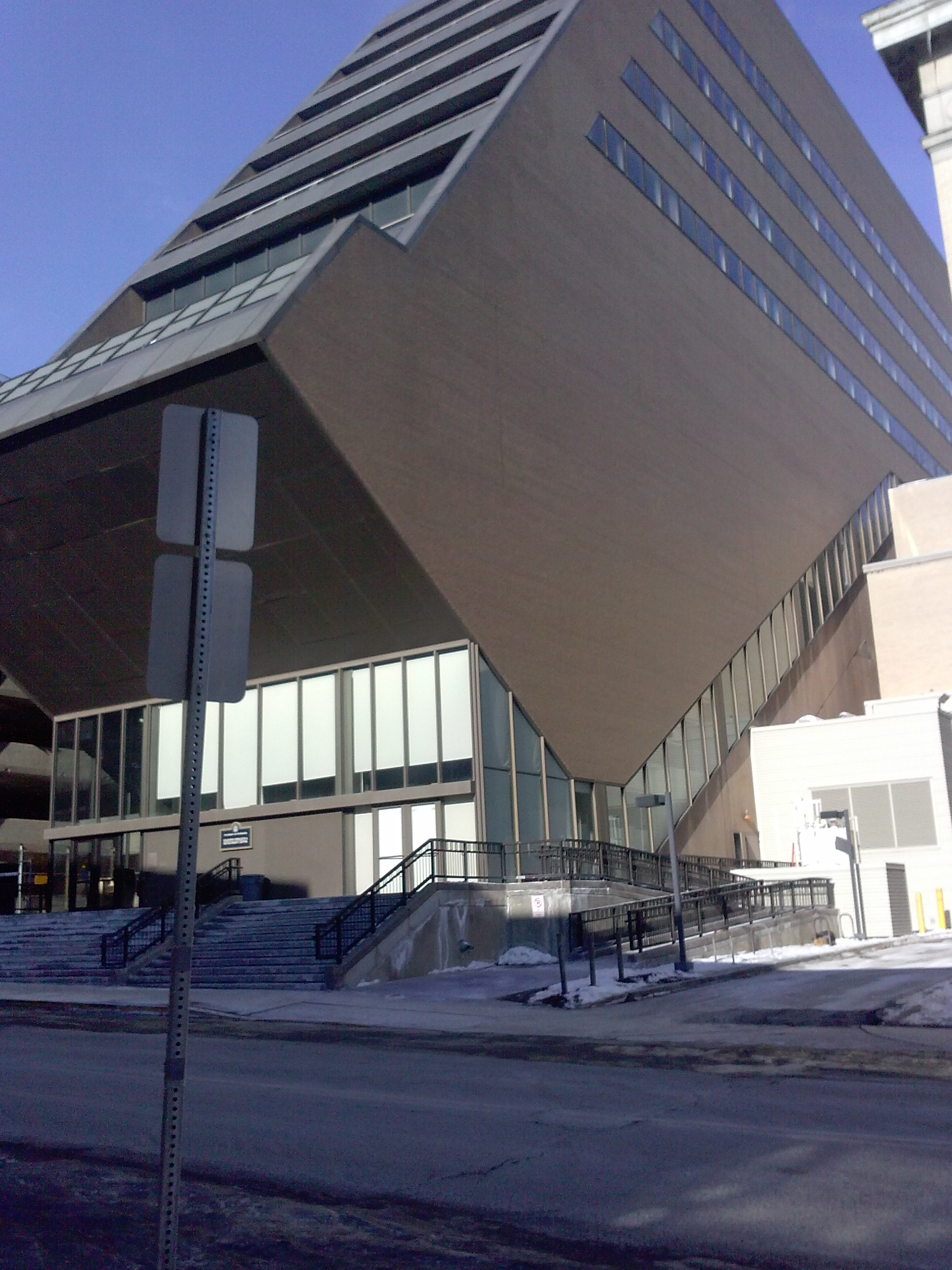
Learning Research and Development Center, Pittsburg

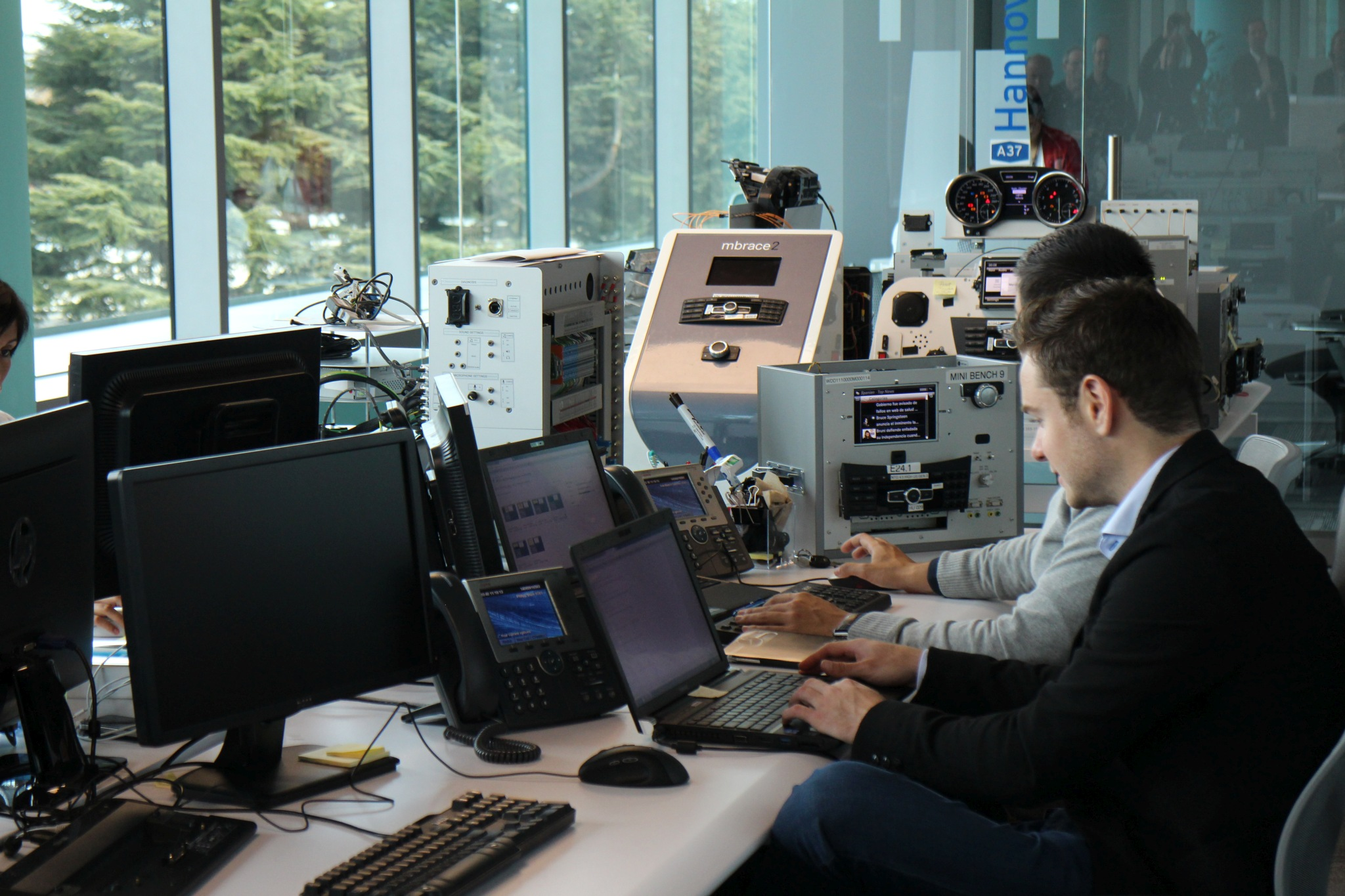
Mercedes Benz Research Development North America

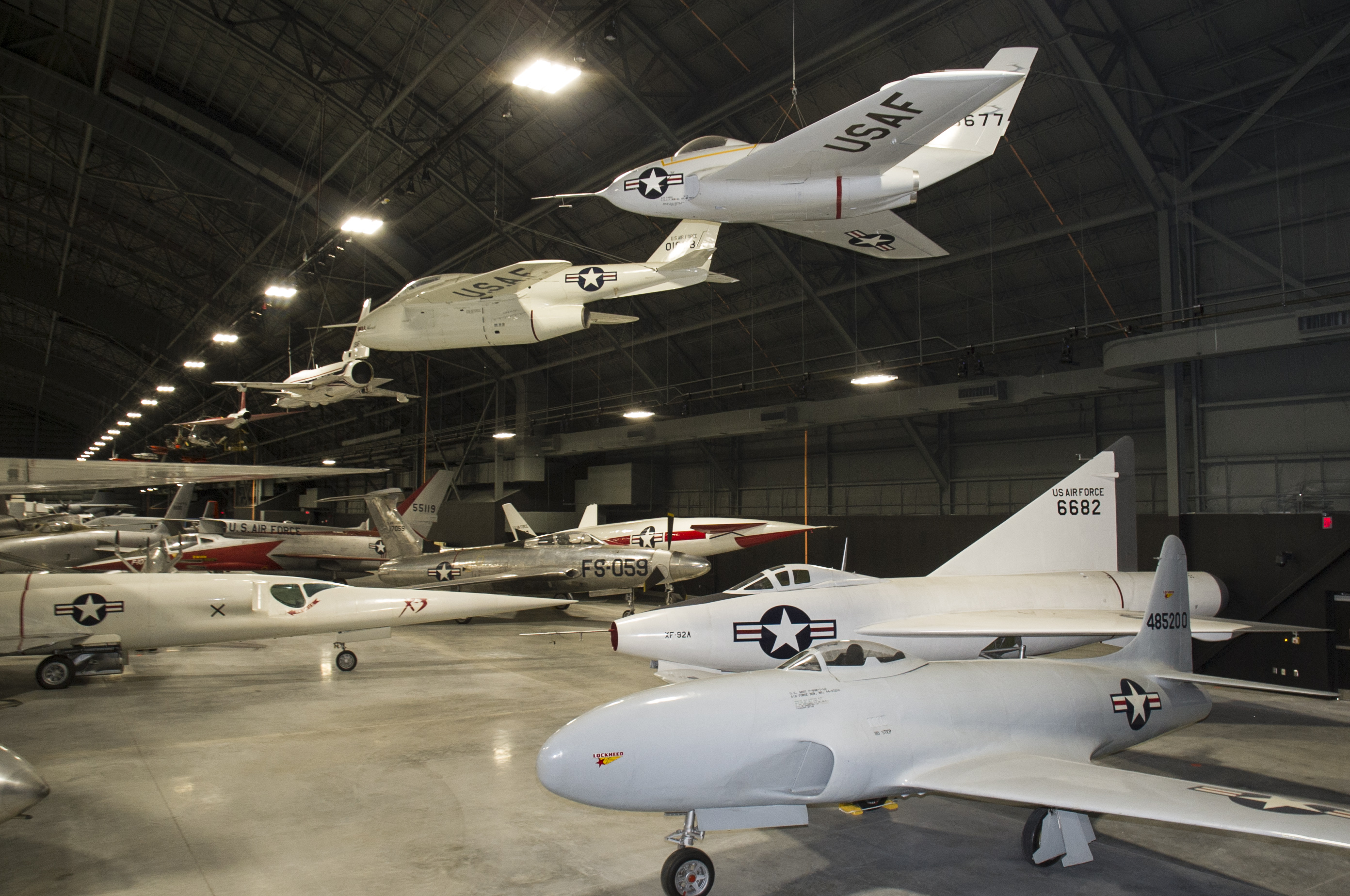
National Museum of the U.S. Air Force-Research and Development Gallery

=== Israel ===
Israel is the world leader in spending on R&D as a percentage of GDP as of 2022, spending 6.02%. According to CSIS, During the 1970s and 1980s Israel initially built up its research infrastructure through various programs, often in the defence industry. In 1984, a law for Encouragement of Research and Development in Industry encouraged the commercial sector to invest in R&D in Israel as well as empowered the Office of Chief Scientist In the 1980s to 1992, the Chief scientist of Israel significantly expanded R&D subsidies in the Israeli industrial sector. Israel invested in the creation of clusters of startups in the high-tech sector as well as venture capital investments. In 1993, Israel initiated the Yozma program, which led to the doubling of value of Israel's 10 new venture capital funds in 3 years. In the late 1990s, Israel was second only to the US in private equity as a share of the general economy. The high tech sector in Israel, known as Silicon Wadi, which earned Israel the nickname - Start-up Nation, was ranked the 4th leading startup ecosystem in the world by Startup genome with a value of $253billion in 2023.

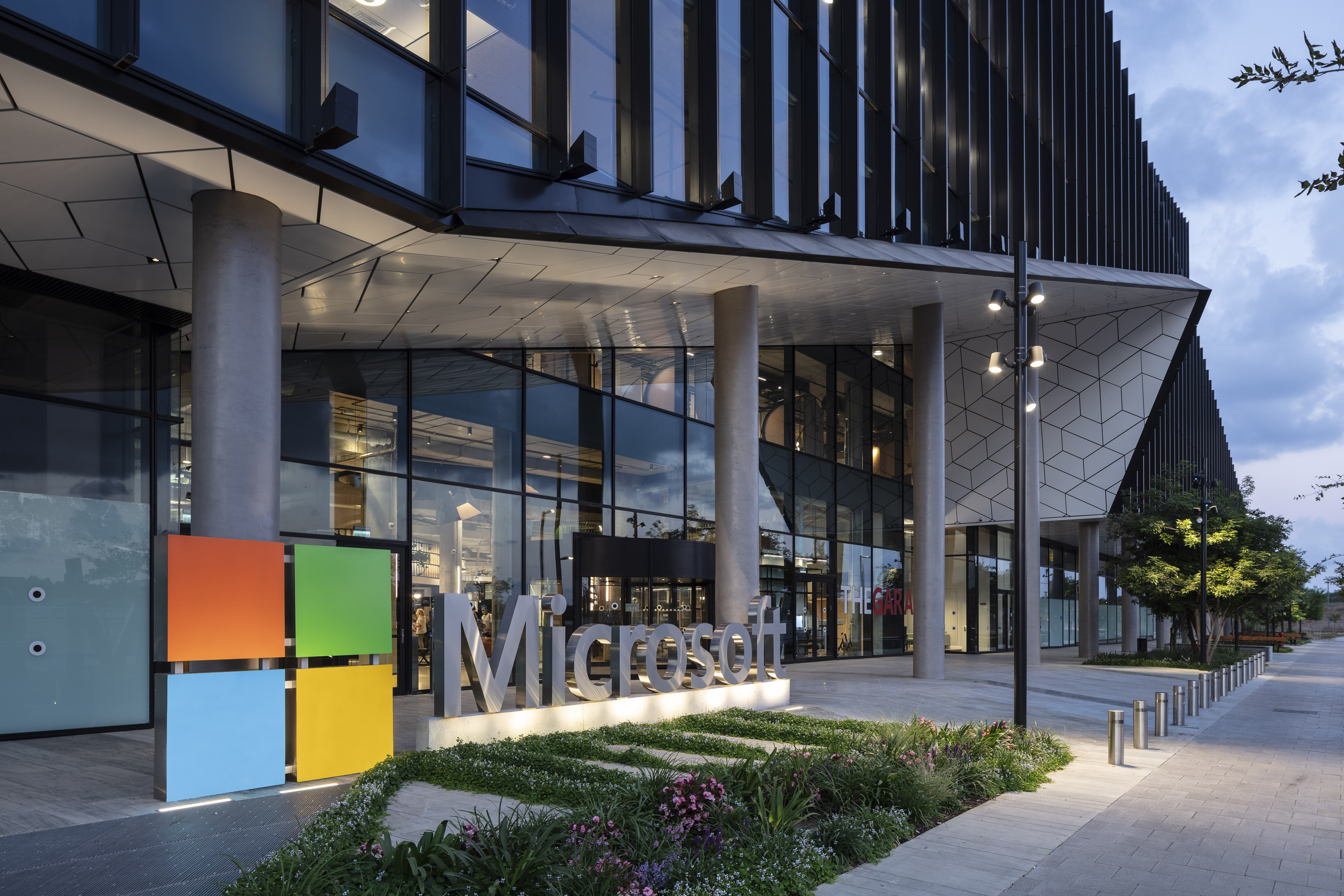
Microsoft Israel R&D Center

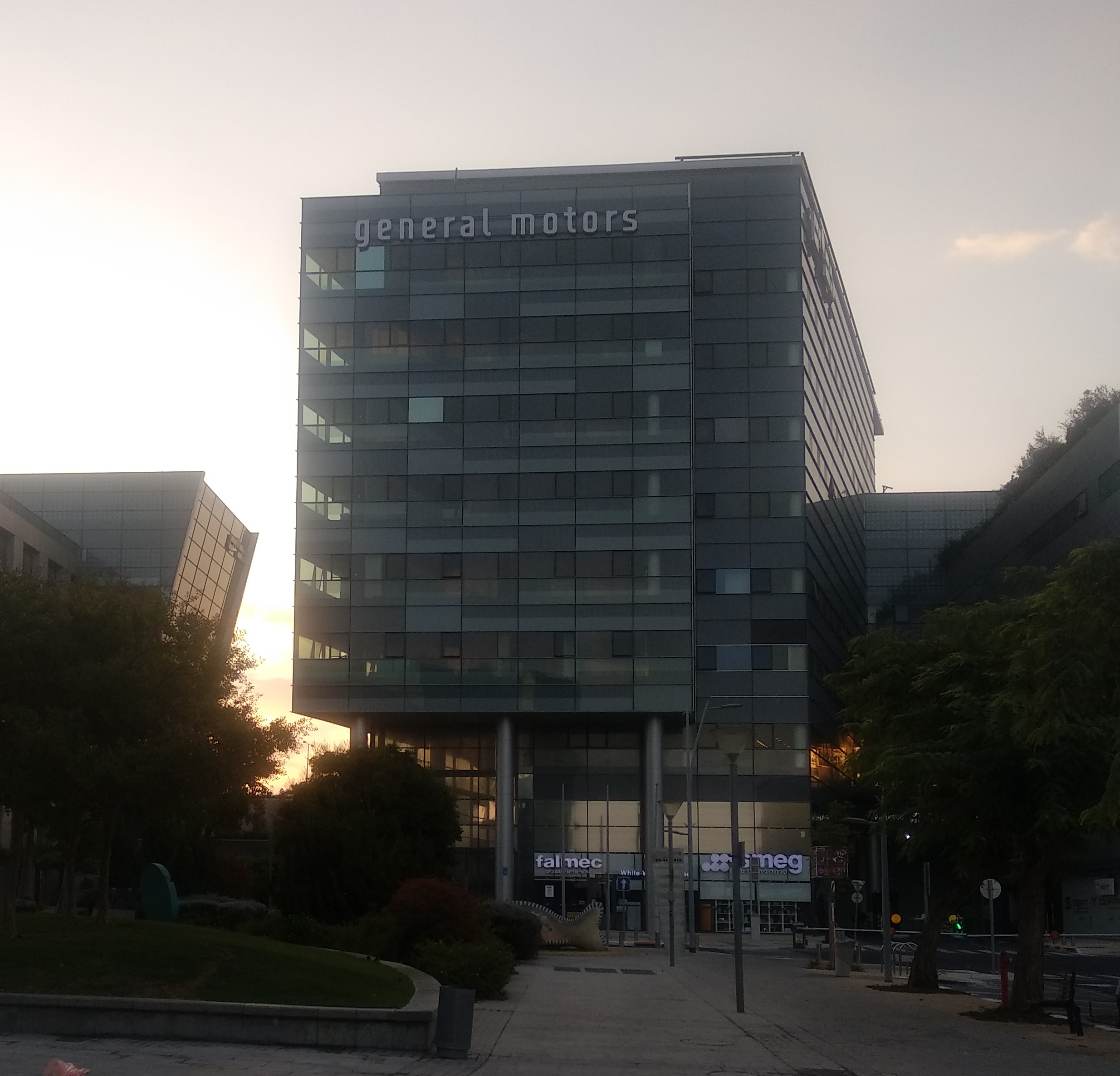
General Motors R&D, Israel

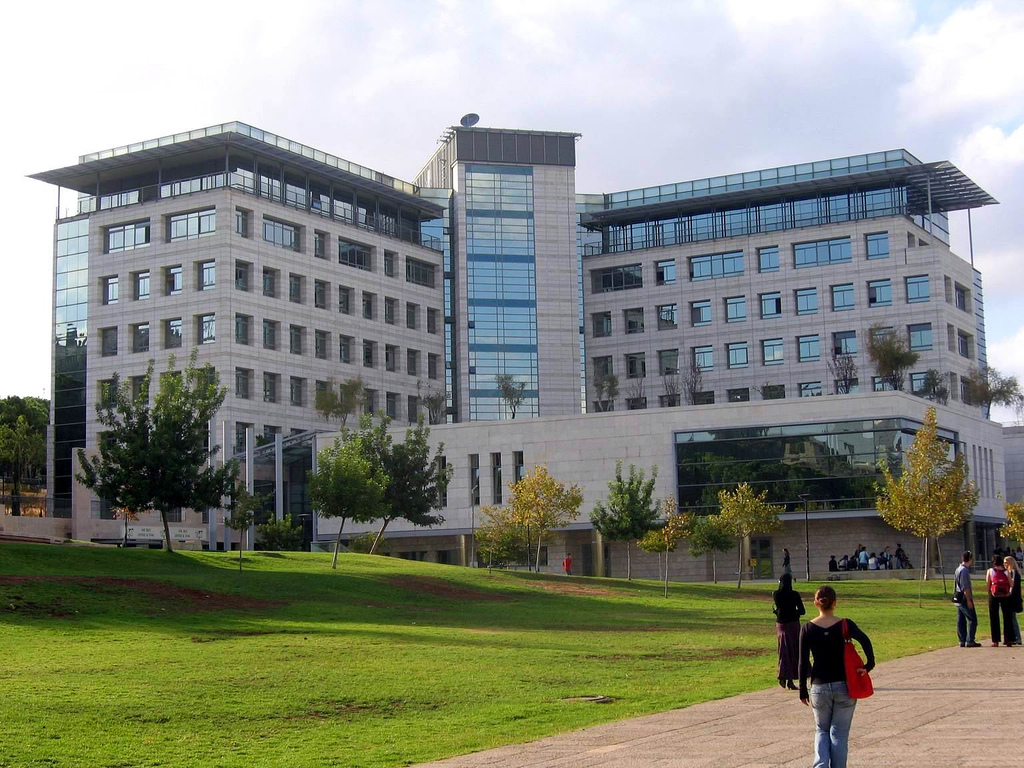
Technion, Computer Science faculty

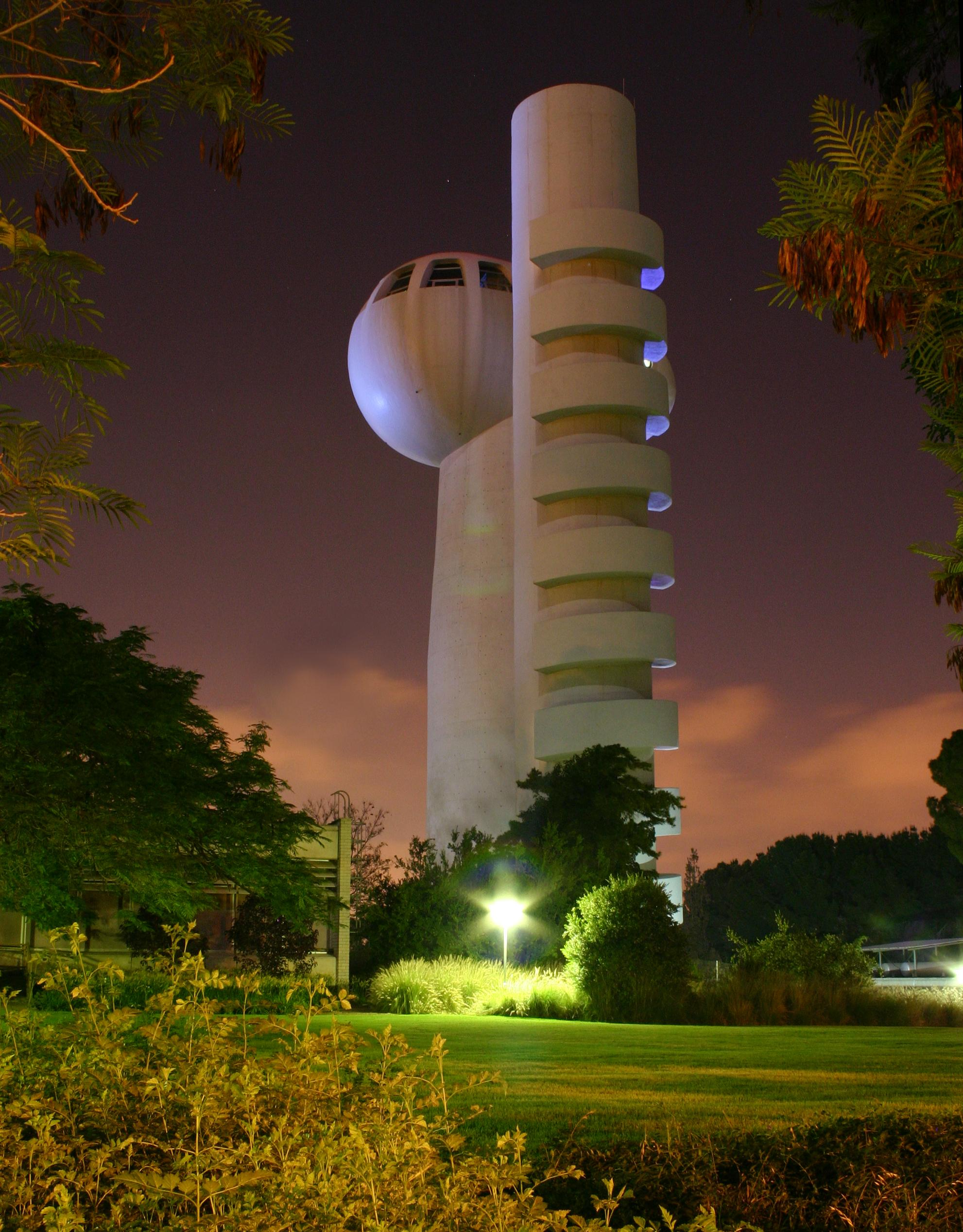
Weizmann Institute, koffler accelerator

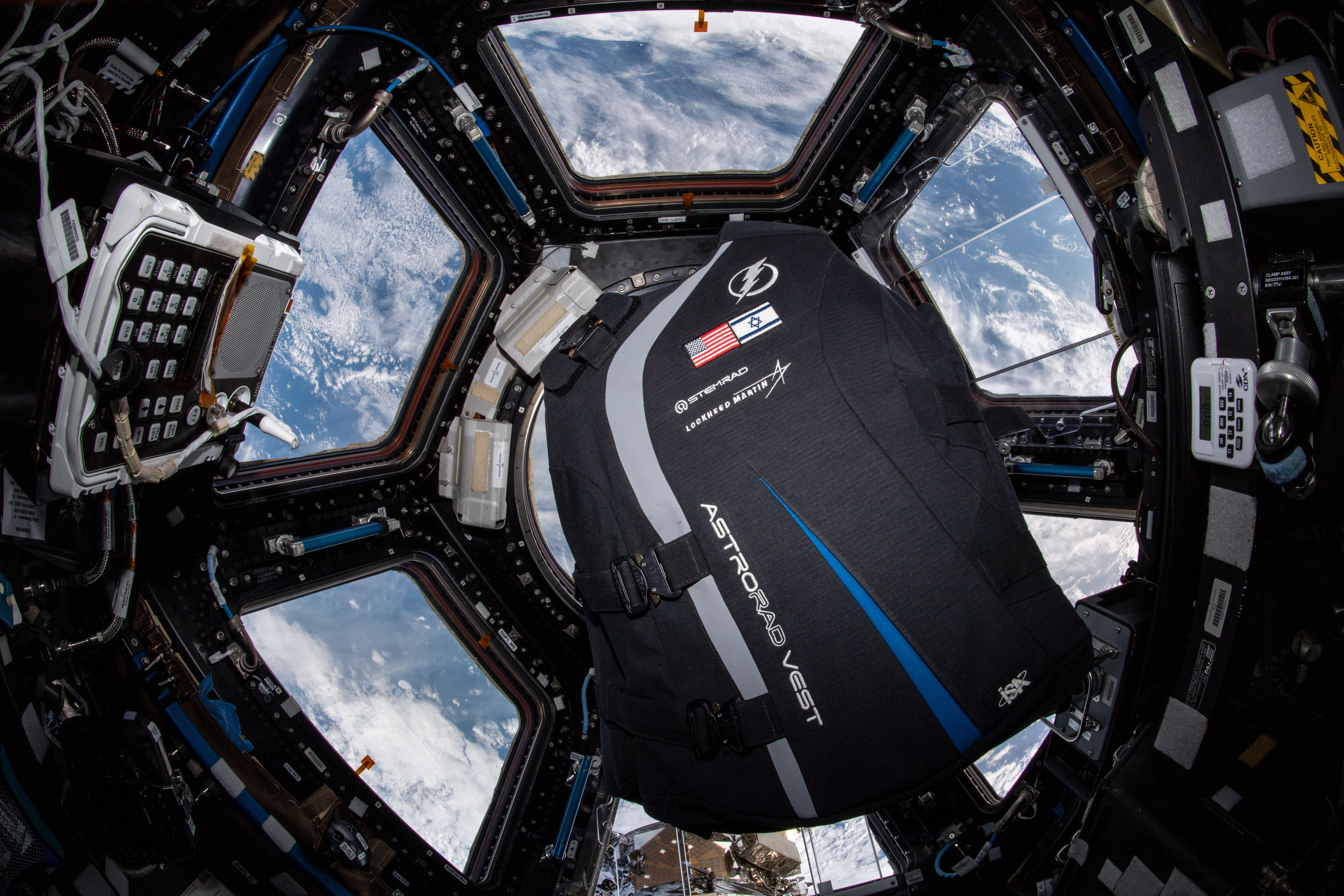
Israeli StemRad astronaut anti radiation suit, picture by NASA

=== South Korea ===
South Korea is one of the leading countries in terms of R&D spending, in addition to having "some of the world’s highest innovation inputs in terms of human capital and research spending." However, in recent years, the country has experienced some slowdown in terms of R&D efficiency. In a 2023 report, The OECD gave Korea numerous suggestions on how to continue to grow their research and development industry. Some of their key suggestions include moving from a "fast-follower" model (improving existing tech) to a "first-mover" model (original, high-risk discovery), as well as strengthening their research system on the whole. Furthermore, OECD emphasizes the need for South Korea to keep up with the ever-changing needs of society and address global transitions in order to ensure their R&D efforts are up to date and efficient.

=== European Union ===
Europe is lagging behind in R&D investments from the past two decades. The target of 3% of gross domestic product (GDP) was meant to be reached by 2020, but the current amount is below this target. This also causes a digital divide among countries since only a few EU Member States have R&D spending.

Research and innovation in Europe are financially supported by the programme Horizon 2020, which is open to participation worldwide.

A notable example is the European environmental research and innovation policy, based on the Europe 2020 strategy which will run from 2014 to 2020, a multidisciplinary effort to provide safe, economically feasible, environmentally sound and socially acceptable solutions along the entire value chain of human activities.

Firms that have embraced advanced digital technology devote a greater proportion of their investment efforts to R&D. Firms who engaged in digitisation during the pandemic report spending a big portion of their expenditure in 2020 on software, data, IT infrastructure, and website operations. A 2021/2022 survey found that one in every seven enterprises in the Central, Eastern and South Eastern regions (14%) may be classed as active innovators — that is, firms that spent heavily in research and development and developed a new product, process, or service — however this figure is lower than the EU average of 18%. In 2022, 67% of enterprises in the same region deployed at least one sophisticated digital technology, and 69% EU firms did the same.

As of 2023, European enterprises accounted for 18% of the world's top 2 500 R&D corporations, but just 10% of new entrants, compared to 45% in the United States and 32% in China.

As of 2024, the electronics sector lead in R&D investment, with 28% of its total investment dedicated to it. This is followed by textiles (19%), digital (18%), and aerospace (15%). Other sectors allocate less than 10% of their total investment to R&D.

While 17% of the world’s top R&D investors are based in the European Union, they accounted for only 1% of acquisitions involving EU-based companies between 2013 and 2023.

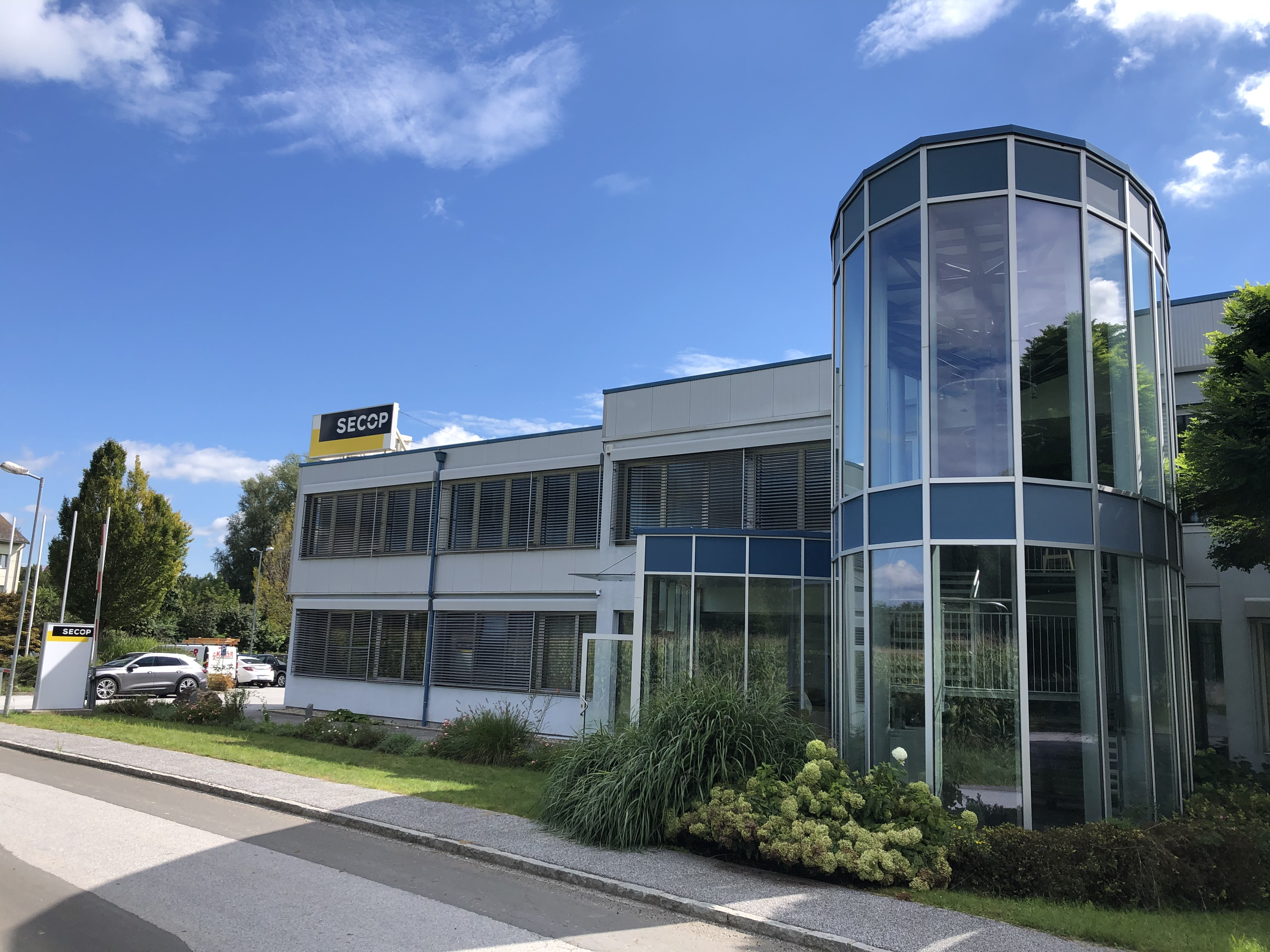
Secop R&D Center in Gleisdorf Austria

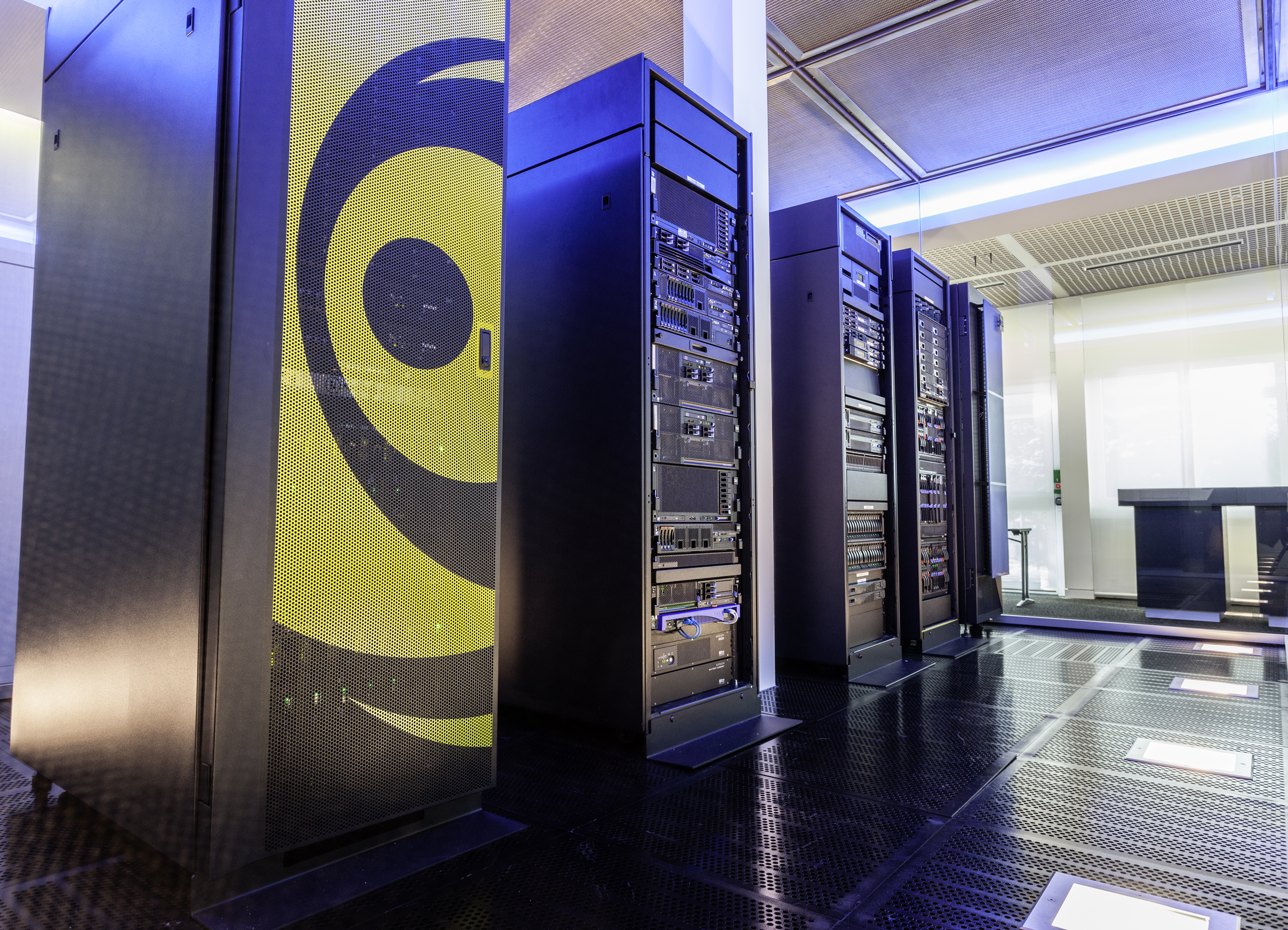
IBM Germany Research & Development

=== Worldwide ===
In 2015, research and development constituted an average 2.2% of the global GDP according to the UNESCO Institute for Statistics.

By 2018, research and development constituted an average 1.79% of the global GDP according to the UNESCO Institute for Statistics. Countries agreed in 2015 to monitor their progress in raising research intensity (SDG 9.5.1), as well as researcher density (SDG 9.5.2), as part of their commitment to reaching the Sustainable Development Goals by 2030. However, this undertaking has not spurred an increase in reporting of data. On the contrary, a total of 99 countries reported data on domestic investment in research in 2015 but only 69 countries in 2018. Similarly, 59 countries recorded the number of researchers (in full-time equivalents) in 2018, down from 90 countries in 2015.

Top countries by R&D spending
Country	R&D as percentage of GDP
Israel	5.44
Korea	4.81
Sweden	3.53
Belgium	3.48
United States	3.45
Japan	3.26
Austria	3.20
Switzerland	3.15
Germany	3.14
Denmark	2.96
Finland	2.94
Iceland	2.47
China	2.40
France	2.35
Netherlands	2.29
Norway	2.28
Slovenia	2.15
Czechia	1.99
Singapore	1.89
Australia	1.83

=== Developing countries ===
While R&D spending is extremely beneficial for rich countries, it does not always have the same effect for poorer, developing countries. These countries may benefit from focusing on innovation and capital development as opposed to increases in R&D spending. It is found that returns to R&D follow an inverted U-shape, meaning returns rise for middle income countries but fall sharply for poor countries, falling very low and even sometimes negative. Other studies find that some poor countries who spend less on R&D sometimes innovate more despite spending less on R&D. According to a sample in a 2013 study, a 25.2% increase in innovation is associated with Bangladesh, a poorer developing country, and a 41.5% likelihood of producing an innovation that is new to the market. The likelihood of producing a new to the market innovation for Malaysia, a more developed country, is 11.7% when R&D spending is present. This suggests that R&D investments may generate higher return on investments for new innovations in less developed countries compared to more developed countries.

== See also ==
- Basic research
- Demonstration
- Industrial laboratory
- Innovation
- List of business and finance abbreviations
- List of companies by research and development spending
- List of countries by research and development spending
- Neglected tropical disease research and development
- Prototype
- Science of science policy
- Science policy
- Technological revolution
- Technology life cycle

== Sources ==
- This article incorporates text from a free content work. Licensed under C-BY-SA 3.0 IGO. Text taken from UNESCO Science Report: the Race Against Time for Smarter Development., Schneegans, S., T. Straza and J. Lewis (eds), UNESCO.
